= Brooklyn Museum =

Art museum in Brooklyn, New York

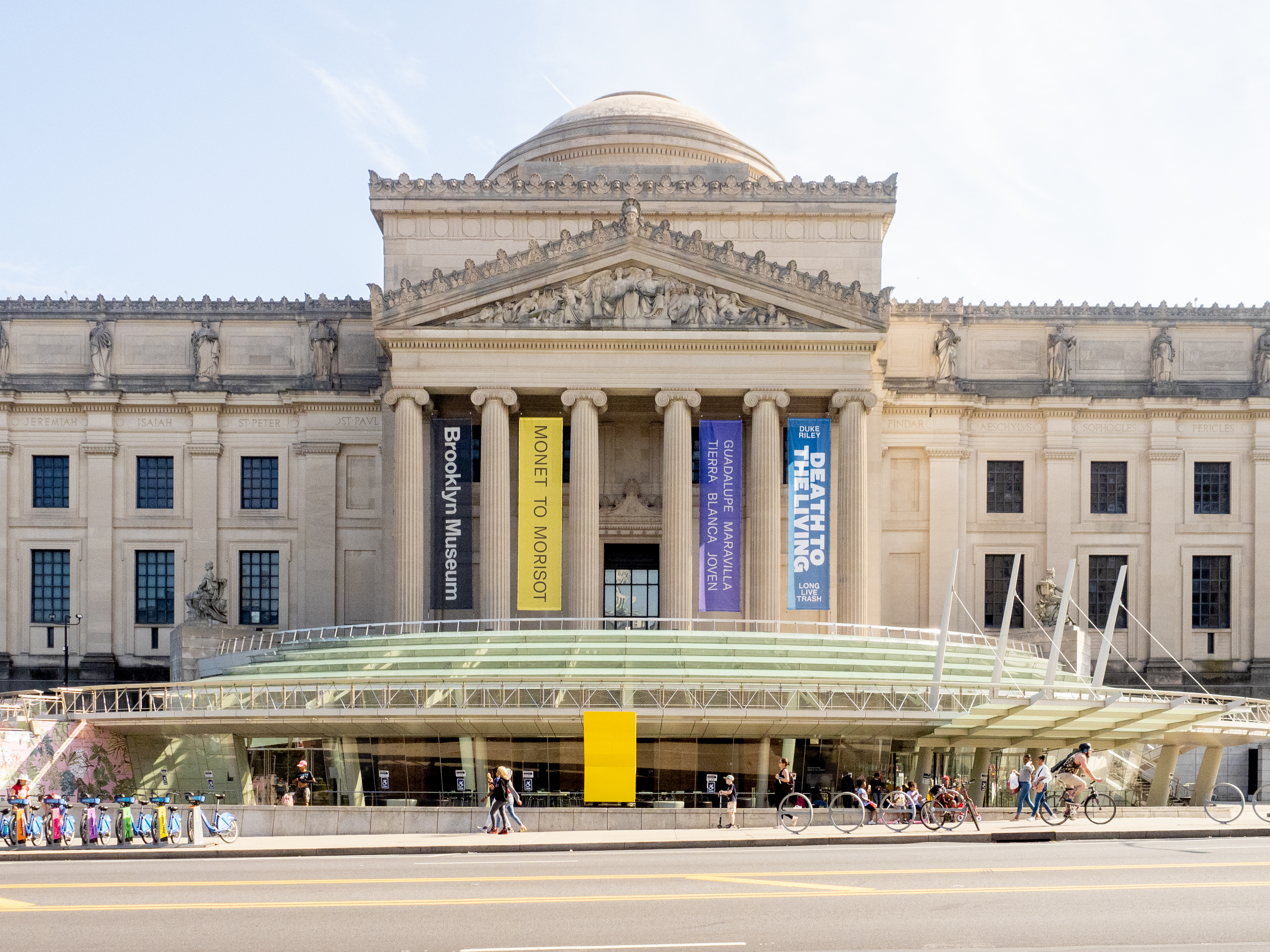
- Entrance facade of Brooklyn Museum in 2022
- Former name: Brooklyn Institute of Arts and Sciences, Brooklyn Museum of Art
- Established: August 1823 (as Brooklyn Apprentices' Library)
- Location: 200 Eastern Parkway, Brooklyn, New York
- Coordinates: 40°40′16.7″N 73°57′49.5″W
- Type: Art museum
- Collection size: 500,000 objects
- Public transit access: Subway: at Eastern Parkway–Brooklyn Museum; Bus: B45, B48
- Website: www.brooklynmuseum.org
- Brooklyn Museum
- U.S. National Register of Historic Places
- New York State Register of Historic Places
- New York City Landmark
- Location: 200 Eastern Parkway; Brooklyn, NY 11238
- Coordinates: 40°40′16.7″N 73°57′49.5″W
- Built: 1895
- Architects: McKim, Mead & White; French, Daniel Chester
- Architectural style: Beaux-Arts
- NRHP reference No.: 77000944
- NYSRHP No.: 04701.000541
- NYCL No.: 0155

Significant dates
- Added to NRHP: August 22, 1977
- Designated NYSRHP: June 23, 1980
- Designated NYCL: March 15, 1966

The Brooklyn Museum is an art museum in the New York City borough of Brooklyn. At 560,000 square feet (52,000 m^{2}), the museum is New York City's second largest and contains an art collection with around 500,000 objects. Located near the Prospect Heights, Crown Heights, Flatbush, and Park Slope neighborhoods of Brooklyn, the museum's Beaux-Arts building was designed by McKim, Mead & White.

The Brooklyn Museum was founded in 1823 as the Brooklyn Apprentices' Library and merged with the Brooklyn Institute of Arts and Sciences in 1843. The museum was conceived as an institution focused on a broad public. The Brooklyn Museum's current building dates to 1897 and has been expanded several times since then. The museum initially struggled to maintain its building and collection, but it was revitalized in the late 20th century following major renovations.

Significant areas of the collection include antiquities, specifically their collection of Egyptian antiquities spanning over 3,000 years. European, African, Oceanic, and Japanese art make for notable antiquities collections as well. American art is heavily represented, starting at the Colonial period. Artists represented in the collection include Mark Rothko, Edward Hopper, Norman Rockwell, Judy Chicago, Winslow Homer, Edgar Degas, Georgia O'Keeffe, and Max Weber.

== History ==
The Brooklyn Museum's origins date to August 1823, when Brooklyn citizens, including Augustus Graham, founded the Brooklyn Apprentices' Library in Brooklyn Heights. The library was formally incorporated November 24, 1824, and the cornerstone of the library's first building was laid in 1825 on Henry and Cranberry Street. The Library moved into the Brooklyn Lyceum building on Washington Street in 1841. The two institutions merged into the Brooklyn Institute in 1843; the institute offered exhibitions of painting and sculpture and lectures on diverse subjects. The Washington Street building was destroyed in a fire in 1891.

=== Development and opening ===
In February 1889, several prominent Brooklyn citizens announced that they would begin fundraising for a new museum for the Brooklyn Institute. The museum's proponents quickly identified a site just east of Prospect Park, on the south side of Eastern Parkway. The next year, under director Franklin Hooper, Institute leaders reorganized as the Brooklyn Institute of Arts and Sciences and began planning the Brooklyn Museum. Brooklyn officials hosted an architectural design competition for the building, eventually awarding the contract to McKim, Mead & White. The competition was characterized in the Brooklyn Daily Eagle as "one of the most important in the history of architecture", as the museum was to contain numerous divisions. The museum remained a subdivision of the Brooklyn Institute of Arts and Sciences, along with the Brooklyn Academy of Music, the Brooklyn Botanic Garden, and the Brooklyn Children's Museum, until these organizations all became independent in the 1970s.

Brooklyn mayor Charles A. Schieren agreed in January 1895 to issue $300,000 per year in bonds for the Brooklyn Institute museum's construction. Initially, only a single wing and pavilion on the western portion of the museum's site, measuring 210 by 50 feet (64 by 15 m) across, was to be built. Engineers began surveying the site that May and found that the bedrock under the site was several hundred feet deep, making it impossible to build the foundations on solid rock. Nonetheless, the engineers had determined that the gravel fill under the site was strong enough to support a building. Construction on the Brooklyn Museum of Arts and Sciences' west wing officially began on September 14, 1895. A groundbreaking ceremony for the museum was hosted on December 14 of the same year. Two of the museum's three stories had been completed by April 1896.

The Brooklyn Institute museum's building was completed in March 1897 after a sidewalk was built between the museum's entrance and Eastern Parkway. The museum's first exhibit was a collection of almost 600 paintings, which had opened to the public on June 1, 1897, several months before the formal opening of the museum. The Brooklyn Institute's museum formally opened on October 2, 1897, and was one of the last major structures built in the city of Brooklyn before the formation of the City of Greater New York in 1898.

=== 20th century ===
==== 1900s and 1910s ====
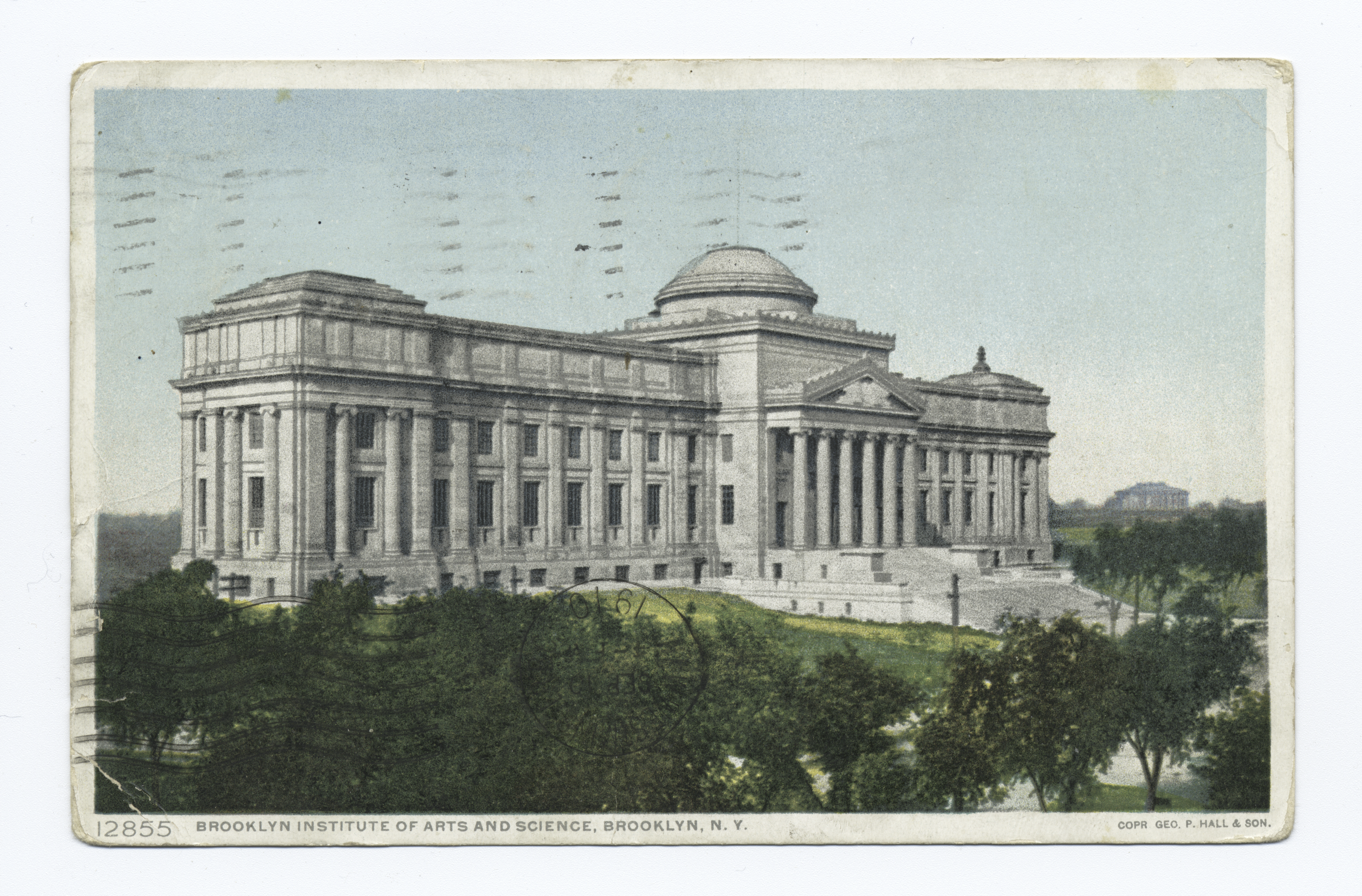
Early 20th century postcard

The Brooklyn Institute approved the construction of the central entrance pavilion in May 1899, and Hooper requested $600,000 for this addition the next month. The four-story structure was to measure 140 by 122 feet (43 by 37 m). The central pavilion was to include a 1,250-seat lecture hall in the basement (actually at ground level), as well as a hall of sculpture on the first floor, which would serve as the museum's main lobby. The second story was to contain natural-history exhibits, while the third story was to include paintings. The New York State Legislature needed to authorize $300,000 in bonds for the pavilion, but they had not done so by the end of 1899. Work on the central wing started in June 1900. The museum's central section was nearly completed by January 1903, but work proceeded slowly due to labor disputes.

New York City mayor Seth Low signed a bill in August 1902, approving $150,000 for the construction of the Brooklyn Institute's eastern wing and pavilion. The eastern wing cost $344,000 to construct, and it officially opened on December 14, 1907. With the opening of the eastern wing, the museum building had reached one-eighth of its total planned size. Although the museum's collections continued to grow, the New York City government was only willing to give the museum as little funding as necessary for essential maintenance. Several of the institute's donors proposed in 1905 to give $25,000 for the upkeep of an "astronomical observatory" at the Brooklyn Museum. City officials endorsed the creation of the observatory in 1907.

The Brooklyn Institute awarded a construction contract for wings F and G, extending south of the central pavilion, to Benedetto & Egan in May 1911. Extending 120 feet (37 m) south and measuring 200 feet (61 m) wide, this addition was to contain a central court with a glass roof. That July, McKim, Mead & White filed plans for wings F and G. The Brooklyn Institute converted the last remaining storage rooms in the eastern wing into galleries in October 1911. The next month, a temporary access road was built from Flatbush Avenue to the rear of the building. Wills & Martin, one of the firms that had been hired to erect the new wings, declared bankruptcy in November 1913. Work stopped completely in November 1914, and the incomplete structures started to deteriorate. Because of the lack of space in the building, the lobby and auditorium were being used to exhibit artwork. The Brooklyn Institute had been forced to decline some donations of artwork, as the works could not be displayed, while other works of art had to be placed in storage.

==== 1920s to 1940s ====
By 1920, the New York City Subway's Institute Park station had opened outside the Brooklyn Museum, greatly improving access to the once-isolated museum from Manhattan and the other boroughs. In April 1922, governor Nathan L. Miller signed legislation authorizing the New York City government to issue bonds to fund wings F and G of the Brooklyn Museum. The New York City Board of Estimate refused to approve the Brooklyn Institute trustees' request for $875,000, and mayor John Francis Hylan also blocked the funding. Hylan changed his mind after visiting the museum, and the Board of Estimate appropriated $1.05 million for the new wings. McKim, Mead & White drew up new plans for wings F and G; by that September, New York City Department of Parks and Recreation (NYC Parks) was about to award contracts for the wings. A picture gallery opened at the museum in November 1925. The next month, museum officials dedicated the Ethnological Gallery, which was nicknamed "Rainbow House"; the gallery was designed by curator Stewart Culin. A Japanese art gallery opened at the museum in April 1927, and the museum's Swiss Gothic, German, and Venetian galleries opened that May.

Construction of the Brooklyn Museum stalled in 1928 after years of attempts to complete it. At the time, only 28 of the 80 proposed statues atop the building's facade had been installed, and the main north–south corridor was not complete. Nineteen American period rooms opened at the museum at the end of 1929. In May 1934, NYC Parks approved plans for the removal of the main entrance steps, which were replaced by ground-level doors. The project also included the construction of two galleries next to the lobby, as well as new landscaping and parking lots. This work was carried out by Public Works Administration laborers. A gallery dedicated to living artists' work opened in February 1935, and a Persian art gallery opened two months later. The remodeled entrance was officially dedicated on October 5, 1935. That December, the museum's medieval art gallery opened. A gallery for industrial art was also proposed behind the western wing but was not built. The museum's remodeling was completed in October 1937. Several collections, including Egyptian and Assyrian art, Renaissance art, and textiles were displayed to the public for the first time.

By early 1938, museum officials sought more than $300,000 for repairs to the museum building, and then-director Philip Newell Youtz said that parts of the building were crumbling. The Brooklyn Museum Art School, formerly a part of the Brooklyn Academy of Music, was moved to the Brooklyn Museum in 1941. An art distribution center sponsored by the Works Progress Administration opened on the museum's sixth floor the same year. The department store chain Abraham & Straus donated $50,000 in 1948 for the establishment of a "laboratory of industrial design" at the Brooklyn Museum. By the following year, Brooklyn Institute officials sought to expand the museum as part of a "vast cultural program". The plans involved an annex with a 2,500-seat auditorium behind the west wing, which was planned to cost $500,000, as well as a general renovation of existing facilities, which was to cost $1.5 million. A new 400-seat lecture hall opened at the museum that September, within space formerly occupied by two Egyptian galleries. To attract visitors, the museum expanded its educational programs greatly in the late 1940s.

==== 1950s and 1960s ====
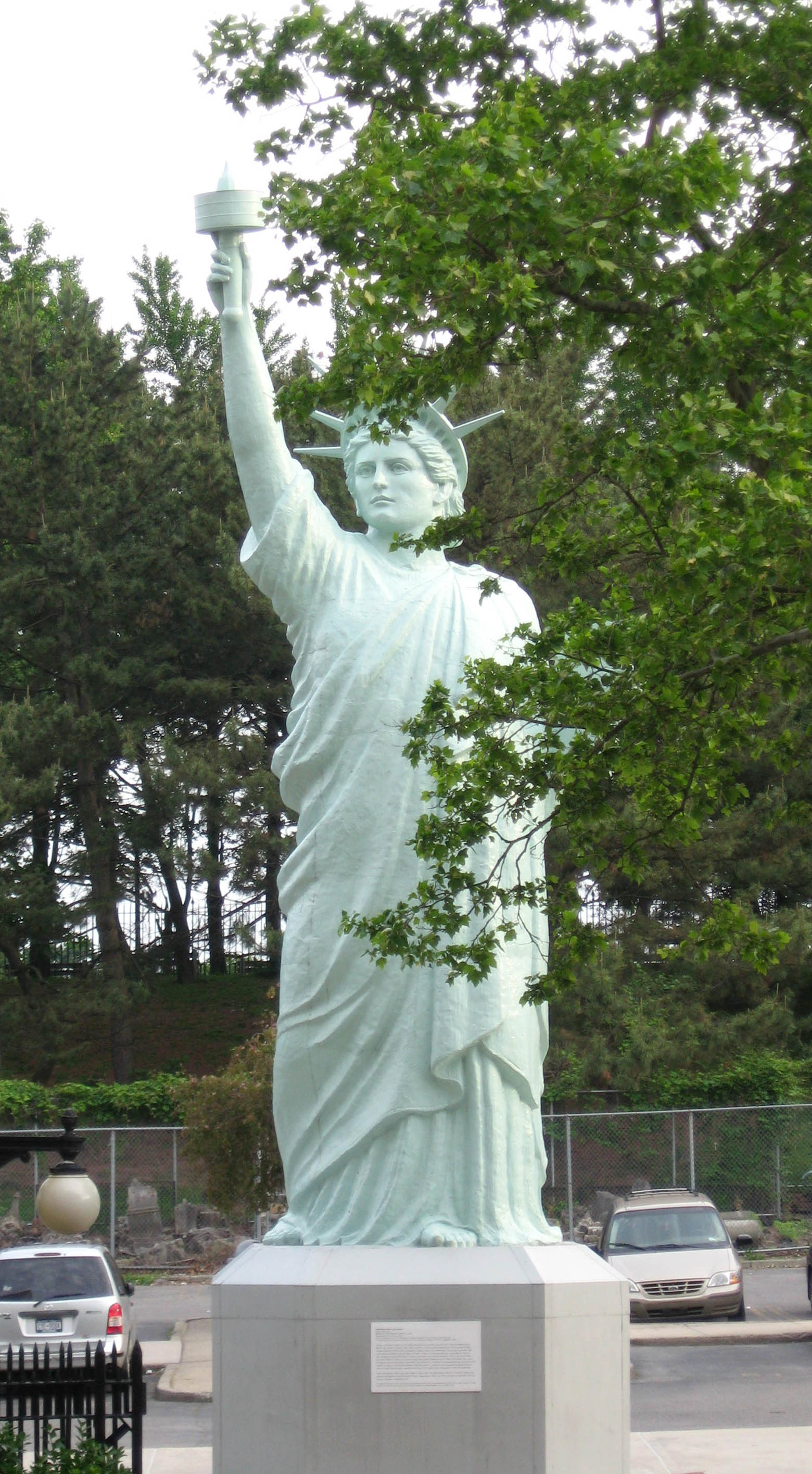
Replica of the Statue of Liberty (Liberty Enlightening the World) in back lot

Brooklyn Institute officials announced plans in 1951 to repair the Brooklyn Museum as part of the institute's long-term plan to convert the museum into a cultural center. The museum's Egyptian galleries began undergoing renovations the same year. The renovation of the Egyptian galleries, the first phase of the museum's $3.5 million overhaul, was finished in November 1953. Brown, Lawford & Forbes designed a rear annex for the museum in 1955. The museum's furniture, sculpture, and watercolor galleries reopened in 1957 following the second stage of the renovation. The rear annex contained a new stairway, which led to new galleries on the fourth through sixth stories of the center section. By the late 1950s, the museum was running low on funds, with director Edgar C. Schenck blaming the museum's fiscal woes on Manhattan residents' unwillingness to cross the East River to visit Brooklyn. Due to a shortage of security guards, the museum was forced to close some galleries part-time.

Another Egyptian gallery opened in April 1959, and a "pattern library" for teaching opened that July. A continued shortage of security guards forced the Brooklyn Museum to close two days a week at the beginning of 1961; the museum went back to seven-day operations in June 1961 after the city provided money for additional guards. To attract visitors, the museum began providing a larger variety of programs and adding interactive exhibits and programming. The Brooklyn Museum announced in 1964 that it would build a special-exhibit gallery on the first floor and an open study/storage gallery on the fifth floor. The Hall of the Americas opened on the museum's first floor the following May. A sculpture garden, consisting of architectural details salvaged from demolished buildings across New York City, opened at the museum in April 1966. The Brooklyn Museum and the Metropolitan Museum of Art began coordinating joint programs and exhibitions in 1967.

By the late 1960s, the museum was again facing a funding shortage; several galleries had been temporarily closed due to a lack of money, and its director Thomas Buechner was considering closing the museum two days a week. Brooklyn Museum officials also wanted to hire additional security guards to deter crime. The Brooklyn Museum's Community Gallery, exhibiting black New Yorkers' art, opened in October 1968 following advocacy from Federated Institutes of Cultural Enrichment (FICE), a coalition of Brooklyn-based arts organizations. The gallery occupied a narrow corridor at ground level. Henri Ghent, the director of the Community Gallery, estimated in 1970 that "perhaps 100,000" additional patrons had been attracted to the museum after the gallery opened, including black patrons who had never before visited a museum.

==== 1970s and early 1980s ====
The Brooklyn Museum continued to experience financial shortfalls in the early 1970s. Due to a shortage of security guards, in mid-1971, museum officials announced that they would close the museum two days per week, allowing all galleries to remain open even with limited security. The museum also reopened its 23 period rooms that October after a yearlong closure, and they also opened a new period room, themed to a private study. Officials planned to move the Community Gallery to a dedicated space adjoining the museum; the gallery was popular among guests but did not have enough funding from the museum itself. By late 1973, twenty percent of the museum's staff professionals had resigned amid a dispute involving director Duncan F. Cameron's firing of another employee, eventually prompting Cameron's own resignation that year. Further staff disputes complicated the search for a replacement director, and many employees went on strike in 1974 because they wanted to form a labor union.

By the mid-1970s, there were plans to split the Brooklyn Children's Museum and the Brooklyn Museum Art School from the Brooklyn Museum. At the time, the museum received $1.5 million per year from the city. Four galleries for Korean and Japanese art opened at the museum in October 1974, and the African art galleries reopened in December 1976 following an expansion and renovation. The Brooklyn Museum also began renovating 21 American period rooms in 1976. Following a 1978 investigation into some of the museum's acquisitions, state attorney general Louis J. Lefkowitz recommended that the museum implement "a comprehensive code of ethics". The same year, the Brooklyn Museum partnered with Designgroup and the Egyptian government to restore the Cairo Museum's collection. Due to budget cuts, the Brooklyn Museum eliminated its Middle Eastern art division in 1979, despite the fact that the museum had frequently applied for federal grants in the preceding years, most of which had been approved from 1976 to 1978.

Two of the museum's period rooms reopened in 1980 following a renovation. By then, director Michael Botwinick was considering several measures to reduce the museum's budgetary shortfalls, including halving the number of art classes, closing the museum during the workweek, and hosting fewer exhibits per year. At the time, the museum received 31 percent of its funds from the city, a higher percentage than other New York City museums; the city still owned the building itself. After Robert Buck became director in 1983, he began hosting additional art classes, attracting members, and raising money for the museum, which struggled to compete with more famous institutions in Manhattan. In 1984, the museum completed the renovations of its last period rooms and opened a gallery for "early-19th-century decorative arts". The unprofitable Brooklyn Museum Art School was closed the same year, and the museum obtained $14 million in city funding to upgrade the climate-control systems. The museum resumed Monday operations in late 1984 after receiving additional city funding, and it started running TV advertisements in 1985.

==== Mid-1980s and 1990s ====
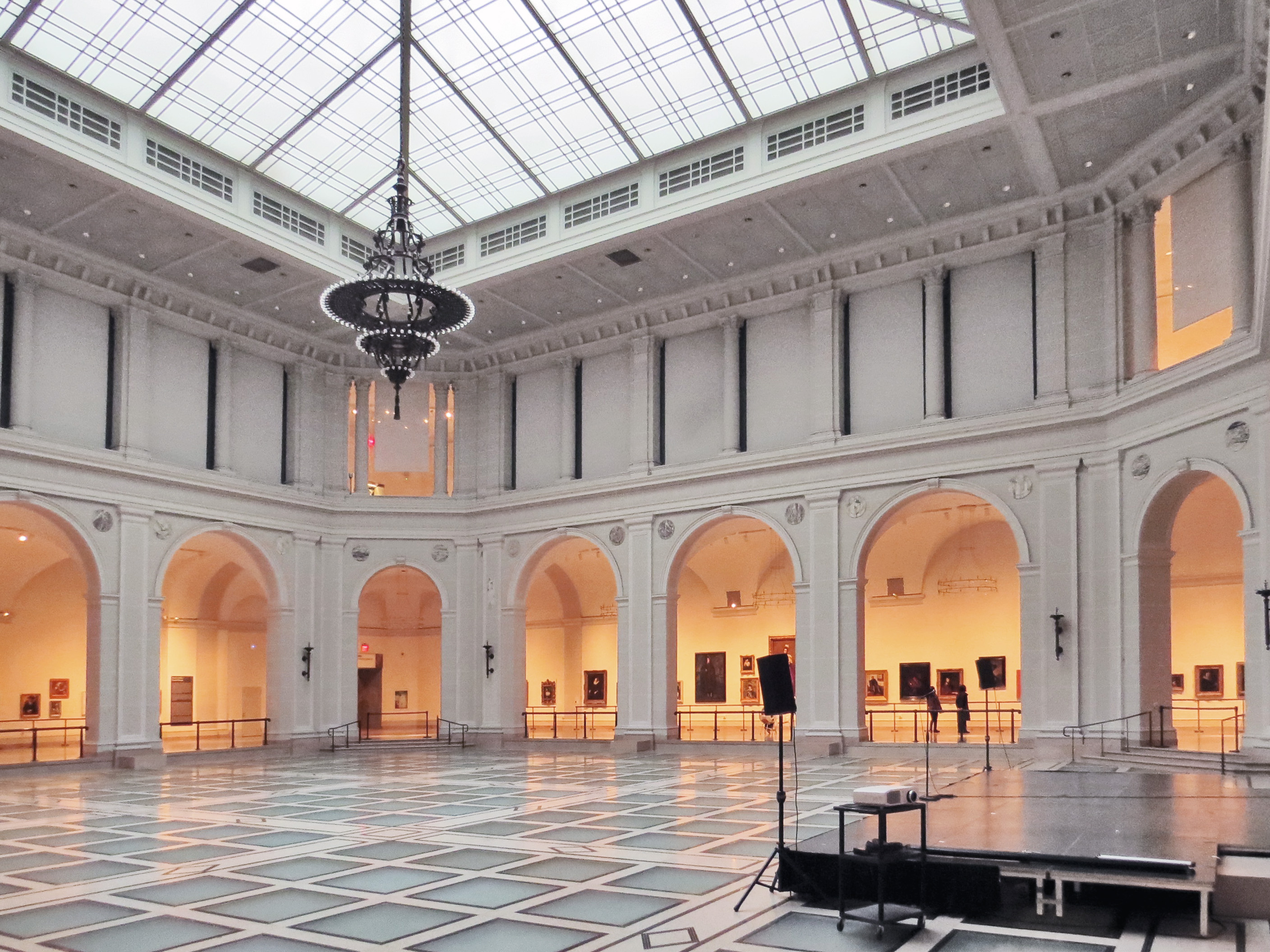
An exhibition hall in the museum

The Brooklyn Museum announced a master plan in March 1986. The plan involved doubling the amount of exhibition space in the building from 450,000 to 830,000 square feet (42,000 to 77,000 m^{2}). At the time, the museum could only exhibit about five percent of its collection simultaneously, as its building was one-sixth as large as originally planned. The museum was to expand its storage, classroom, and conservation facilities and add an auditorium. Buck met with the heads of all of the museum's departments to determine how much exhibit and storage space they needed. The museum also planned a new entrance from the Brooklyn Botanic Garden, which had twice as many annual visitors; the Botanic Garden entrance had been planned by McKim, Mead & White but never executed. The project was expected to cost $50 million to $100 million, which was to be funded by the city's capital budget.

Museum officials held an architectural design competition to redesign the west wing, attracting 103 competitors; they hired Arata Isozaki of James Stewart Polshek Partners that October. Isozaki's design retained much of McKim, Mead & White's original plan but included a "great hall" and trapezoidal courtyards, as well as an angled rear wall and an obelisk. Buck expressed optimism that media coverage of the design competition would attract additional visitors, even if the master plan was never completely carried out. The scope of the renovation grew quickly, with estimated costs reaching $200 million by early 1988. Iris and B. Gerald Cantor donated $3.5 million for the museum's auditorium in 1989, and the city gave another $2 million for other work. The Brooklyn Museum announced in 1990 that it would begin the first phase of renovation, which was to cost $31 million. This involved converting the offices in the west wing to about 64,000 square feet (5,900 m^{2}) of gallery space for its Egyptian collection, as well as building storage space and an auditorium. The same year, budget cuts prompted museum officials to lay off employees and close its doors on Mondays.

The auditorium opened in 1991; at the time, there had not been an auditorium at the museum for over half a century. About 33,000 square feet (3,100 m^{2}) in the museum's west wing reopened as gallery space in November 1993. The renovation retained the original layout of the west-wing spaces. The New York Times described Isozaki and Polshek's renovation as aiming for "clean, serene spaces"; the rooms had rooms with maple floors, white walls, horizontal lighting strips, and granite baseboards. The west wing was renamed for investor Morris A. Schapiro and his brother, art historian Meyer Schapiro, in early 1994 after Morris Schapiro donated $5 million.

The Brooklyn Museum changed its name to Brooklyn Museum of Art in 1997. According to acting director Linda S. Ferber, the renaming was necessary because "there was more confusion about the museum's identity than we supposed"; for instance, many visitors still believed the museum had natural-history exhibits, which had not been the case since 1934.

=== 21st century ===
==== 2000s and 2010s ====
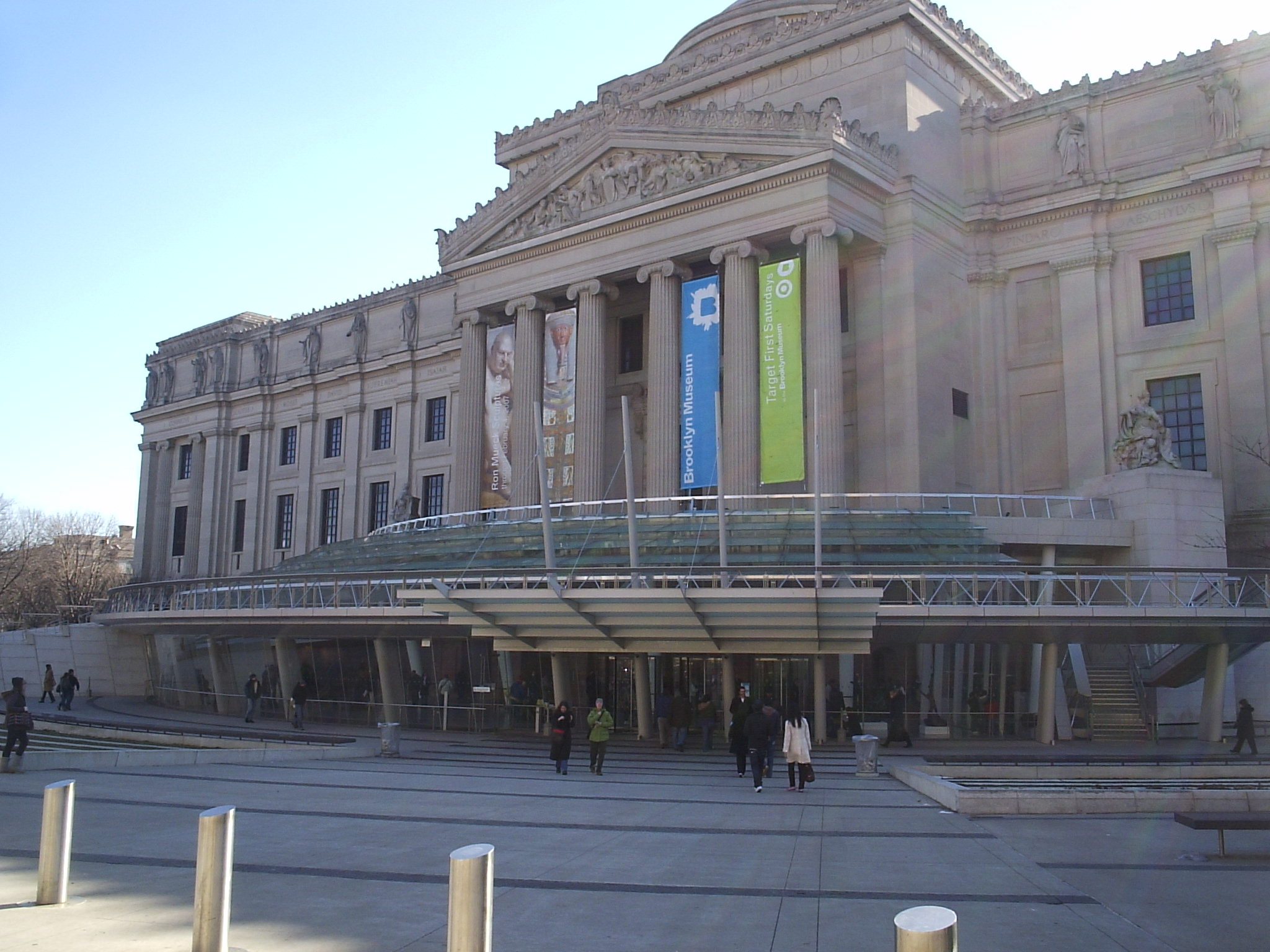
The Eastern Parkway entrance to the Brooklyn Museum, rebuilt in 2004

Brooklyn Museum officials hired architect James Polshek in 2000 to design a new glass-clad entrance for the building at a cost of $55 million. Polshek described the front entrance as a "wasteland" at the time, and he said he wanted to build "Brooklyn's new front stoop". The New York City Landmarks Preservation Commission approved Polshek's design, despite opposition from preservationists. The renovation cost $63 million and also added air conditioning throughout the museum building. The Henry Luce Foundation gave the museum a $10 million grant in 2001, which funded the construction of the Luce Center for American Art on the fifth floor. The museum's renovation was completed in April 2004. At the same time, the museum announced that it would revert to its previous name, Brooklyn Museum. By then, the Brooklyn Museum was focusing on attracting Brooklyn residents, rather than visitors from other boroughs. The Elizabeth A. Sackler Center for Feminist Art opened on the museum's fourth floor in March 2007.

The museum extensively renovated its Great Hall, which reopened in early 2011, and it relocated and reopened its African art gallery on the first floor the same year. A 4,150-square-foot (386 m^{2}) museum shop opened at the Brooklyn Museum in early 2012, followed later that year by a new cafe. The upscale restaurant Saul opened within the Brooklyn Museum in October 2013, changing its name to The Norm in 2016. For a decade starting in the mid-2010s, the museum spent $100 million on various upgrades to its building. By then, the museum was facing financial difficulties, and half of the 465,000 annual patrons did not pay admission because of the museum's suggested admission policy. The Brooklyn Museum's Chinese-art gallery reopened in 2019.

==== 2020s to present ====
The museum was temporarily closed from March to October 2020 because of the COVID-19 pandemic in New York City. During the George Floyd protests in New York City in June 2020, the museum participated in the Open Your Lobby initiative, being one of two major art institutions in New York City (along with MoMA PS1) to provide protesters with shelter or resources. The Brooklyn Museum received $50 million from the New York City government in 2021, the largest such gift in the museum's history. The money was to be used to renovate 40,000 square feet (3,700 m^{2}) into gallery space. The museum's South Asian and Islamic galleries reopened in 2022, completing a 12-year renovation of the Asian galleries. To make way for additional exhibition space, in early 2024 the museum sold off 200 objects and the contents of four period rooms. That January, the museum opened its Toby Devan Lewis Education Center, which contains three studios and a gallery. The museum started using a new logo that September.

In 2021, Brooklyn Museum staff organized to form a union representing various roles, including curators, educators, and front-desk workers. The union vote passed with strong support, and union members ratified their first contract in November 2023, following two years of negotiations. In 2024, multiple pro-Palestine protests occurred at the museum as a part of the broader movement calling for institutions to divest from Israel. Due to increasing financial deficits, in museum officials laid off employees and reduced the number of annual exhibitions in early 2025, though further job reductions were averted due to increased funding from the city. In early 2026, the museum hired Peterson Rich Office to renovate 6,400 square feet (590 m^{2}) of space on the third floor, creating four galleries for the museum's African art collection. The renovation was planned to take a year and cost $13 million.

== Building ==
The Brooklyn Museum building is a steel frame structure clad in masonry, designed in the neoclassical style by the architectural firm of McKim, Mead, and White and built by the Carlin Construction Company. The original museum building is a New York City designated landmark and was added to the National Register of Historic Places in June 1978. The museum shares a large city block with Brooklyn's Central Library, Mount Prospect Park, and the Brooklyn Botanic Garden to the west and south.

=== Exterior ===
The original design for the Brooklyn Museum proposed a structure four times as large as what was built from 1893 through 1927, when construction ended. As designed, the three-story museum building was supposed to have several wings, centered around a memorial hall and clustered around four light courts. After Brooklyn became part of greater New York City in 1898, support for the project diminished. Only the wings on the northern end, as well as the northeastern light court (known as the Auditorium Court), were built; the resulting L-shaped building covers a site of about 4.5 acres (1.8 ha). Although additional wings were built behind the original east wing over the years (creating the current light court), nothing was built behind the west wing. This led the New York Daily News to liken the museum building to a movie set.

==== Main facade ====
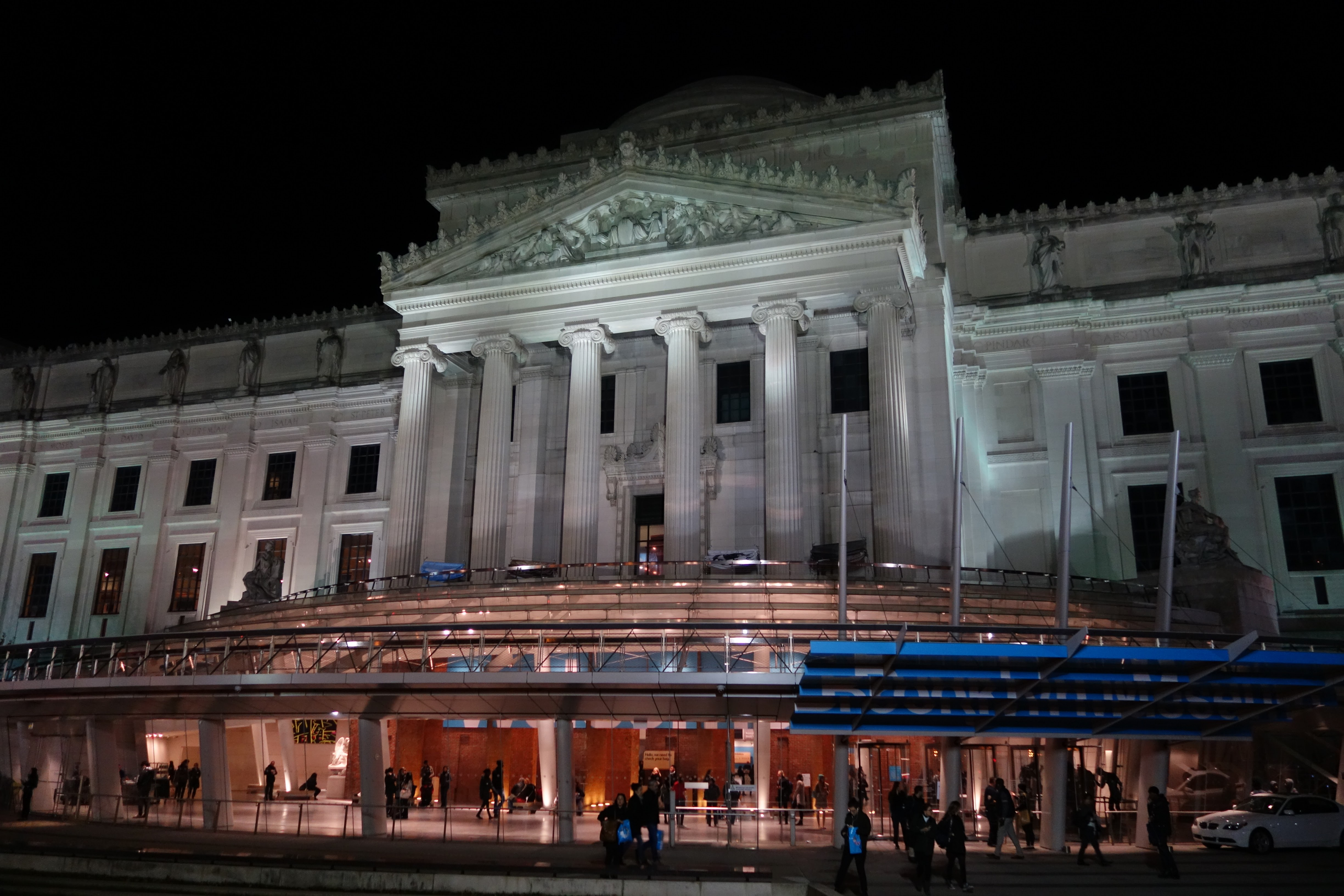
The museum at night

The primary elevation of the facade, facing north along Eastern Parkway, is 510 feet (160 m) wide and consists of the west and east wings, which flank a projecting pavilion with a portico. Additional pavilions project from the facade at either end. The center portico contains six Ionic columns that support a pediment with sculptures in its tympanum. The portico was originally accessed by a staircase that was removed in 1936–1937. Daniel Chester French was responsible for the pediment sculptures. French also designed the two allegorical figures Brooklyn and Manhattan flanking the museum's entrance; they were created in 1916 for the Brooklyn approach to the Manhattan Bridge and relocated to the museum in 1963. Above the pediment is a copper cresting with anthemia, as well as a low saucer dome. The modern main entrance, dating to Polshek's 2004 renovation, consists of a glass pavilion with four metal pylons, as well as a semicircular plaza just outside. A set of brick piers, which had supported the original entrance staircase, was repurposed into a brick arch in 2004.

The pavilions at either end of the Eastern Parkway facade protrude only slightly from the facade and contain engaged columns in the Ionic order. The west and east wings are divided vertically by pilasters; between each set of pilasters are windows with architraves. The entablature above the pilasters contains a frieze with inscribed names of figures who represent knowledge.

The Eastern Parkway facade is topped by 20 monolithic figures on the cornice: one above each pilaster on the west and east wings, and four above the pavilions. An additional ten figures, five each on the western and eastern elevations of the outermost pavilions, were sculpted. The sculptures were carved by the Piccirilli Brothers, who sculpted a total of 30 figures on the museum's facade. Fourteen sculptors were hired to design the sculptures, which each measure 12 feet (3.7 m) high. Had the full building been completed, there would have been 80 sculptures in total, with 20 each depicting classical subjects, medieval and Renaissance subjects, modern European and American subjects, and Asian subjects. The 30 extant sculptures consist of the 20 classical sculptures (10 Greek and 10 Roman) on the northern elevation, as well as five Persian and five Chinese sculptures on the side elevations.

==== Other facades ====
The eastern elevation of the facade faces Washington Avenue, where only the pavilion at the northern end was built. The rest of the eastern elevation is similar to that on Eastern Parkway, with pilasters dividing it vertically into seven bays. Unlike on Eastern Parkway, the pilasters are topped by shorter pilasters rather than sculptures. The southern elevation faces a parking lot and contains a masonry facade and some windows. There is also an annex to the south, designed by Brown, Lawford & Forbes, which contains a secondary entrance and a stairway.

=== Interior ===
The oldest portion of the building measured 193 by 71 feet (59 by 22 m) and comprised only about three percent of what was originally planned. The center of the first floor would have contained a memorial hall, while a "great hall of sculpture" would have extended to the north and south of the memorial hall. To the west of the memorial hall would have been gallery space for artwork on loan, while to the east would have been a multi-story auditorium. The remaining corners of the first floor would have included several additional galleries for the museum's permanent collections, and the light courts would have exhibited large objects. The second floor would have housed more collections and lecture rooms, while the third floor would have had the library, music room, and galleries for images, domestic art, and science. An additional story, above the central part of the building, would have housed more departments of the museum.

The main lobby, originally occupied by the ground-level auditorium, was built during the mid-20th century as a modern-style space. Although then-director Philip Newell Youtz was the architect of record, the lobby's design may have been influenced by William Lescaze, who was Youtz's friend. The lobby, containing black-glass panels and indirect lighting, was described in the 1939 WPA Guide to New York City as "an example of the best in modern architecture... devoid of the elaborate decoration which so often clutters up the entrances of public building." Following a 2011 renovation, the lobby was redesigned as a double-height central gallery surrounded by 25-foot-tall (7.6 m) columns.

== Operations ==
The Brooklyn Museum is operated by a nonprofit of the same name, which was established in 1935. The museum is part of the Cultural Institutions Group (CIG), a group of institutions that occupy land or buildings owned by the New York City government and derive part of their yearly funding from the city. It was also part of the Brooklyn Educational Cultural Alliance during the late 20th century. During the late 1980s, the museum was part of a group called Destination Brooklyn, which sought to attract visitors to Brooklyn; this initiative had stalled by the early 1990s.

=== Directors ===
Franklin Hooper was the Brooklyn Institute's first director, serving for 25 years until his death in 1914. Hooper was succeeded by William Henry Fox, who served from 1914 to his retirement in 1934. Fox was followed by Philip Newell Youtz from 1934 to 1938. Laurance Page Roberts was director from 1938 to 1942, when his wife Isabel Spaulding Roberts became interim director on his behalf; L. P. Roberts formally resigned in 1946. His immediate successor, Charles Nagel Jr., served for nine years until he resigned in 1955. Edgar Craig Schenck, who was appointed director shortly afterward, served until his death in 1959. Thomas S. Buechner became the museum's director in 1960, making him one of the youngest directors in the country. During Buechner's tenure, Donelson Hoopes was hired as Curator of Paintings and Sculptures from 1965 to 1969.

Duncan F. Cameron assumed the directorship in 1971, following Buechner's resignation; Cameron himself resigned in 1973. Michael Kan was appointed as acting director in early 1974, serving for a few months. He was succeeded by Michael Botwinick, who was appointed in 1974 and stepped down in 1982. Robert T. Buck became director in 1983 and served until he resigned in 1996, upon which Linda S. Ferber became acting director. Arnold L. Lehman was named as the museum's director in April 1997, and Lehman announced in September 2014 that he would retire the next year. In May 2015, Creative Time president and artistic director Anne Pasternak was named the museum's next director; she assumed the position on September 1, 2015.

Since 2014, the director's position has formally been known as the Shelby White and Leon Levy Director of the Brooklyn Museum, after Leon Levy Foundation cofounder Shelby White donated $5 million to the directorship's endowment.

=== Funding ===
According to the museum's website, it receives funding from the city government, Brooklyn borough president's office, mayor's office, New York City Council, state government, federal government, and other agencies. In 2005, the museum was among 406 New York City arts and social service institutions to receive part of a $20 million grant from the Carnegie Corporation, in turn funded by New York City mayor Michael Bloomberg. Major benefactors have historically included Frank Lusk Babbott. The museum is the site of the annual Brooklyn Artists Ball which has included celebrity hosts such as Sarah Jessica Parker and Liv Tyler.

Prior to the COVID-19 pandemic, the Brooklyn Museum had an endowment of $108 million, but the museum applied for federal funding through the Paycheck Protection Program after its endowment declined by one-fifth in 2020. Amid the pandemic and its negative impact on museum revenue, the museum raised funds for an endowment to pay for collections care by selling or deaccessioning works of art. The October 2020 sale consisted of 12 works by artists including Lucas Cranach the Elder, Gustave Courbet, and Jean-Baptiste-Camille Corot, while other sales throughout that month included Modernist artists. Though usually prohibited by the Association of Art Museum Directors, the association allowed such sales to proceed for a two-year window through 2022 in response to the effects of the pandemic.

== Art and exhibitions ==
The Brooklyn Museum's collection contains around 500,000 objects. In the twentieth century, Brooklyn Museum exhibitions sought to present an encyclopedic view of art and culture, with a focus on educating a broad public. By the 21st century, the Brooklyn Museum frequently hosted shows that promoted cultural diversity and, in particular, underrepresented demographic groups.

=== Notable exhibitions ===
In 1923, the museum was one of the first U.S. institutions to exhibit African cast-metal and other objects as art, rather than as ethnological artifacts. The museum's acquisitions during this time also included such varied objects as the interior of a Swiss house, a stained glass window, and a pipe organ. The museum's first period room opened in 1929; these period rooms represented middle-class and non-elite citizens' homes, in contrast to other museums. which tended to focus on upper-class period rooms. The 17th-century Jans Martense Schenck house became part of the Brooklyn Museum's collection in the 1950s, as did the interior of a room in John D. Rockefeller Jr.'s Midtown Manhattan home.

In 1967 the Federated Institutes of Cultural Enrichment (FICE), a coalition of Brooklyn-based arts organizations, demanded that the Brooklyn Museum exhibit more works by artists from the borough, especially African American artists. The museum then hired black curator Henri Ghent to direct a new "Community Gallery", supported at first by the New York State Council on the Arts; he worked at the museum till 1972. Ghent's first exhibition, Contemporary Afro-American Arts (1968), included artists Joe Overstreet, Kay Brown, Frank Smith, and Otto Neals.

In 1999–2000, the Sensation exhibition of Charles Saatchi's collection provoked controversy for its inclusion of works such as Chris Ofili's The Holy Virgin Mary. The exhibition prompted then-mayor Rudolph Giuliani to threaten to withhold city funding from the museum. In the resulting lawsuit, a U.S. district court judge ruled that the New York City government could not withhold city funds from the Brooklyn Museum on First Amendment grounds.

In 2002, the museum received the work The Dinner Party, by feminist artist Judy Chicago, as a gift from The Elizabeth A. Sackler Foundation. Its permanent exhibition began in 2007, as a centerpiece for the museum's Elizabeth A. Sackler Center for Feminist Art. In 2004, the Brooklyn Museum featured Manifest Destiny, an 8-by-24-foot (2.4 m × 7.3 m) oil-on-wood mural by Alexis Rockman that was commissioned by the museum as a centerpiece for the second-floor Mezzanine Gallery and marked the opening of the museum's renovated Grand Lobby and plaza. Other exhibitions have showcased the works of various contemporary artists including Patrick Kelly, Chuck Close, Denis Peterson, Ron Mueck, Takashi Murakami, Mat Benote, Kiki Smith, Jim Dine, Robert Rauschenberg, Ching Ho Cheng, Sylvia Sleigh William Wegman, Jimmy de Sana, Oscar yi Hou, Baseera Khan, Loraine O'Grady, John Edmonds, Cecilia Vicuña, Sonia Guiñansaca, and a 2004 survey show of work by Brooklyn artists, Open House: Working in Brooklyn

In 2008, curator Edna Russman announced that she believes 10 out of 30 works of Coptic art held in the museum's collection—second-largest in North America are fake. The artworks were exhibited starting in 2009.

In early to mid-2018, the museum hosted what was the final stop of the touring exhibit David Bowie Is, which had begun in 2013 in London and visited nearly a dozen countries before reaching the Brooklyn Museum. Costumes from The Crown and The Queen's Gambit television series were put on display as part of its virtual exhibition "The Queen and the Crown" in November 2020. From June through September 2023, coinciding with the fiftieth anniversary of Pablo Picasso's death, the museum hosted It's Pablo-matic: Picasso According to Hannah Gadsby, curated by Hannah Gadsby; though the exhibition was popular, it was also highly controversial. To celebrate the 200th anniversary of the Brooklyn Apprentices' Library's incorporation, the museum launched a series of special exhibits and events in 2024.

== Collections ==
=== Egyptian, Classical, and Ancient Near Eastern Art ===
The Brooklyn Museum has been building a collection of Egyptian artifacts since the beginning of the twentieth century, incorporating both collections purchased from others, such as that of American Egyptologist Charles Edwin Wilbour, whose heirs also donated his library to become the museum's Wilbour Library of Egyptology, and objects obtained during museum-sponsored archeological excavations. The Egyptian collection includes objects ranging from statuary, such as the well-known "Bird Lady" terra cotta figure, to papyrus documents (among others the Brooklyn Papyrus). The museum has nine mummified Egyptians.

The Egyptian, Classical, and Ancient Near Eastern collections are housed in a series of galleries in the museum. Egyptian artifacts can be found in the long-term exhibit, Egypt Reborn: Art for Eternity, as well as in the Martha A. and Robert S. Rubin Galleries. Near Eastern artifacts are located in the Hagop Kevorkian Gallery.

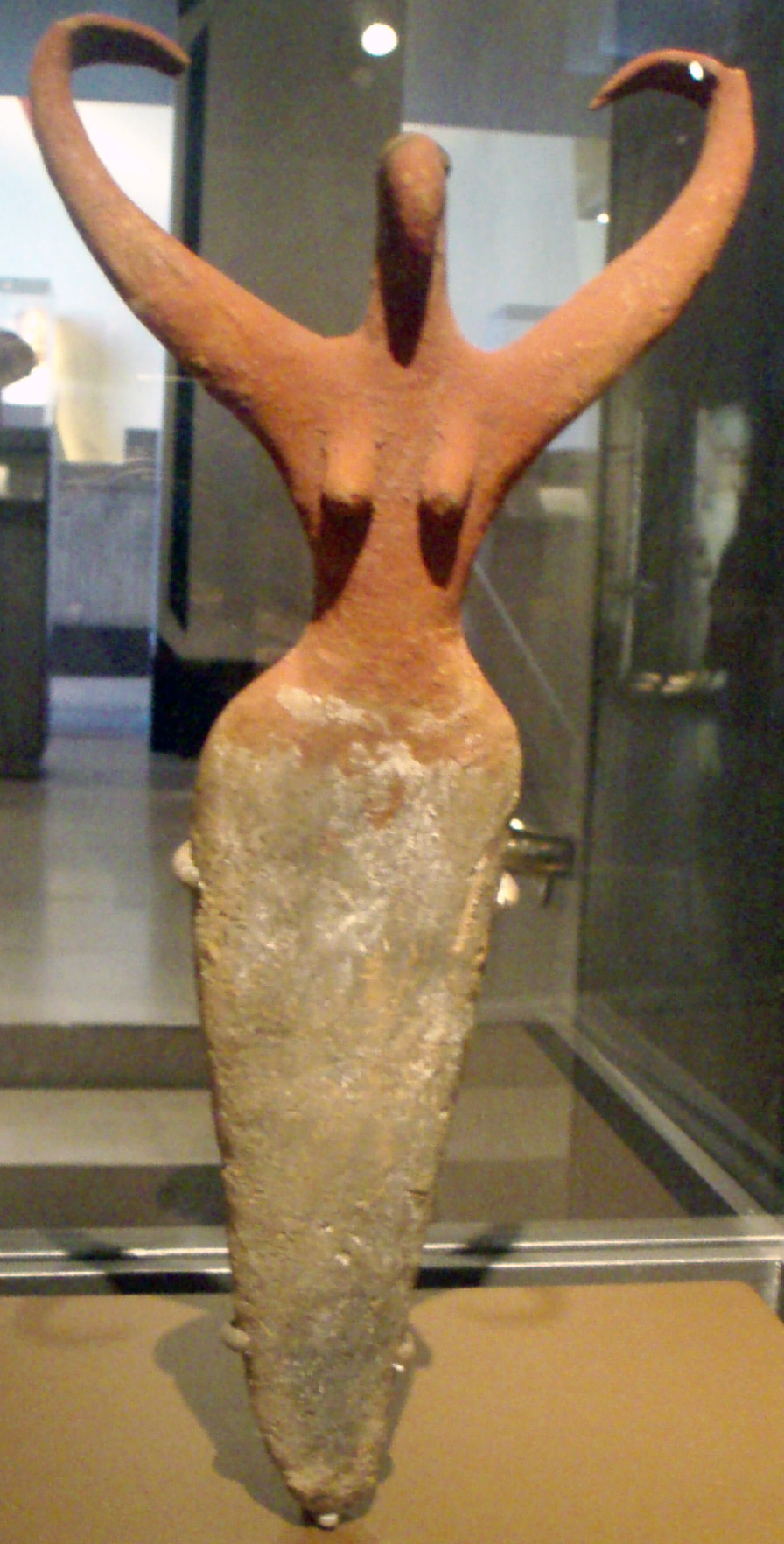
The "Bird Lady" sculpture, Predynastic female figurine

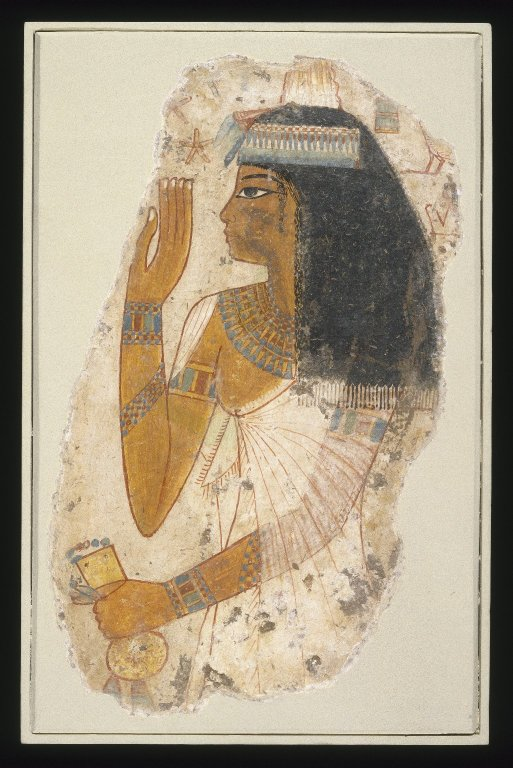
Painting of Lady Tjepu, New Kingdom Dynasty 18, Reign of Amunhotep III, c. 1390–1352 BCE, from tomb no. 181 at Thebes, 65.197

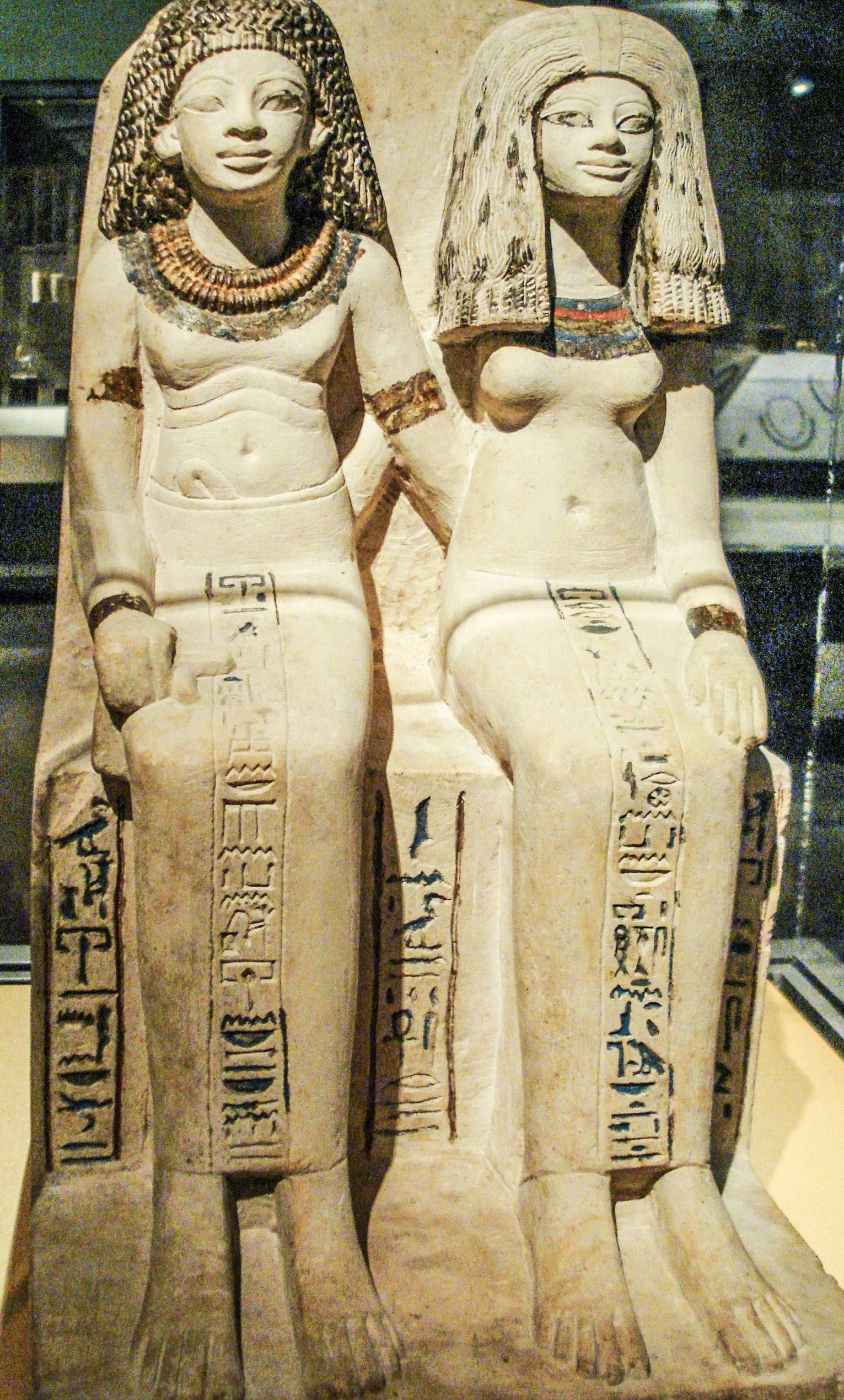
Pair statue of husband and wife Nebsen and Nebet-ta. New Kingdom, Dynasty XVIII, reign of Thutmose IV or Amenhotep III, c. 1400–1352 BCE.

=== American art ===
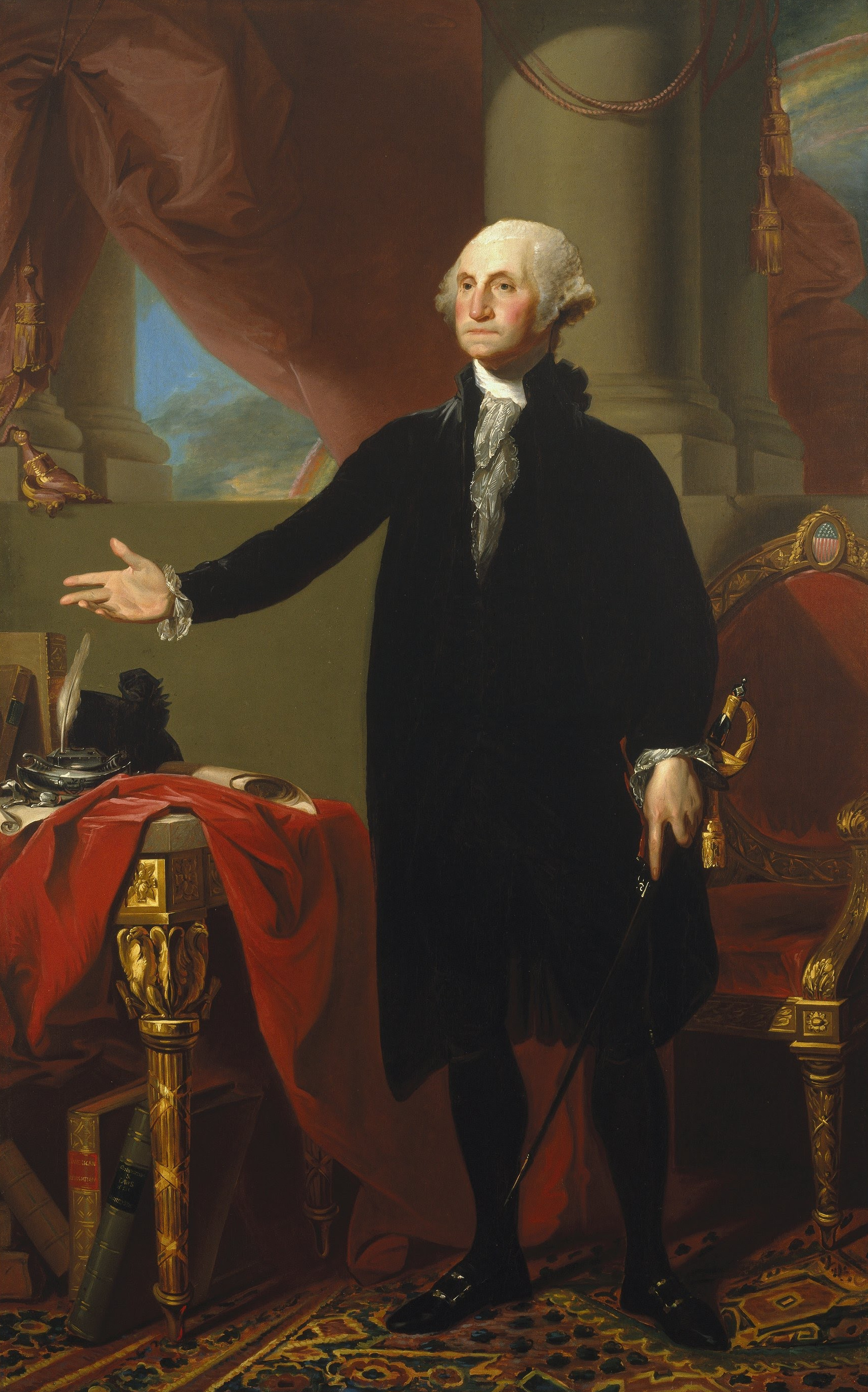
Gilbert Stuart, Portrait of George Washington, 1796

Francis Guy's Winter Scene in Brooklyn (c. 1820) was the first object in the museum's collection of American art, bequeathed in 1846. In 1855, the museum officially designated a collection of American Art, with the first work commissioned for the collection being a landscape painting by Asher B. Durand. Items in the American Art collection include portraits, pastels, sculptures, and prints; all items in the collection date to between c. 1720 and c. 1945.

Represented in the American art collection are works by artists such as William Edmondson (Angel, date unknown), John Singer Sargent's Paul César Helleu sketching his wife Alice Guérin (ca. 1889); Georgia O'Keeffe's Dark Tree Trunks (ca. 1946), and Winslow Homer's Eight Bells (ca. 1887). Among the most famous works in the collection are Gilbert Stuart's portrait of George Washington and Edward Hicks's The Peaceable Kingdom. The museum also holds a collection by Emil Fuchs.

Works from the American art collection can be found in various areas of the museum, including in the Steinberg Family Sculpture Garden and in the exhibit, American Identities: A New Look, which is contained within the museum's Visible Storage ▪ Study Center. In total, there are approximately 2,000 American Art objects held in storage.

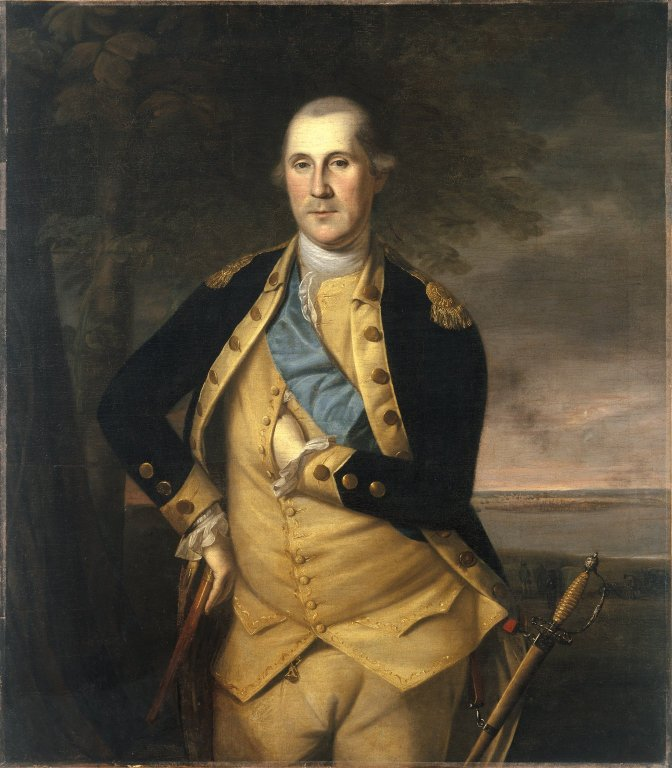
Charles Willson Peale, George Washington, c. 1776

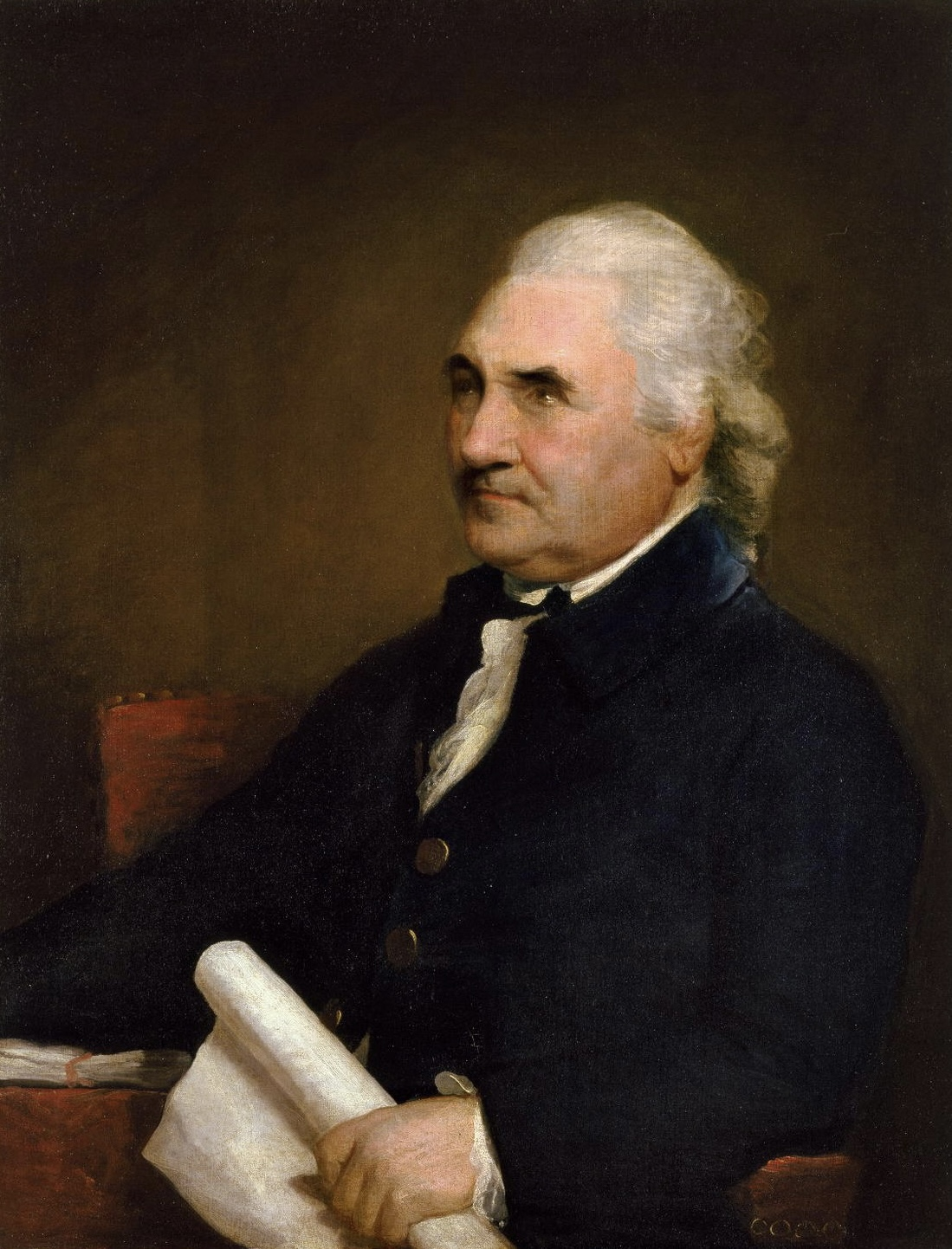
Gilbert Stuart, Portrait of Isaac Barré, 1785

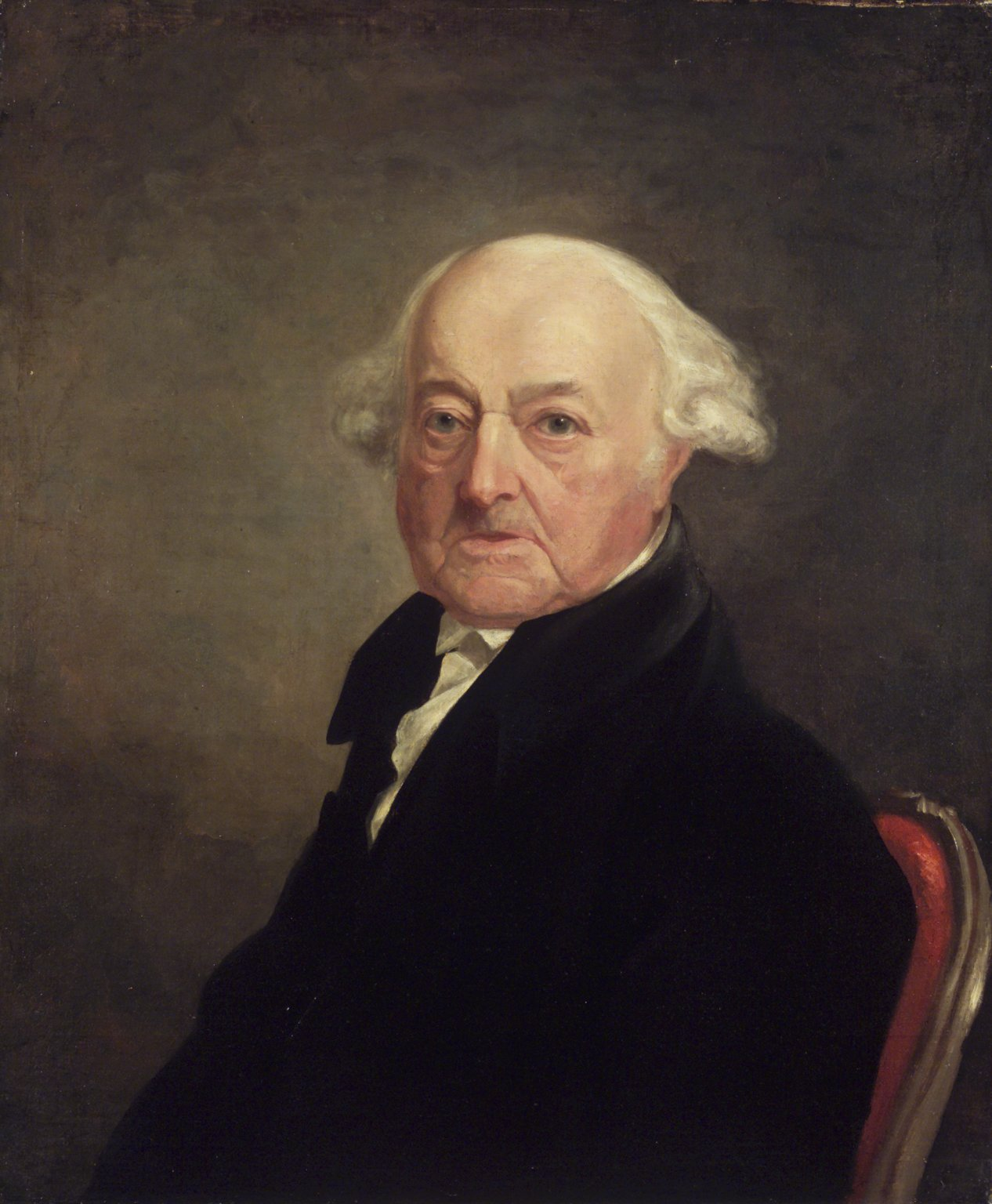
Samuel Morse, Portrait of John Adams, 1816

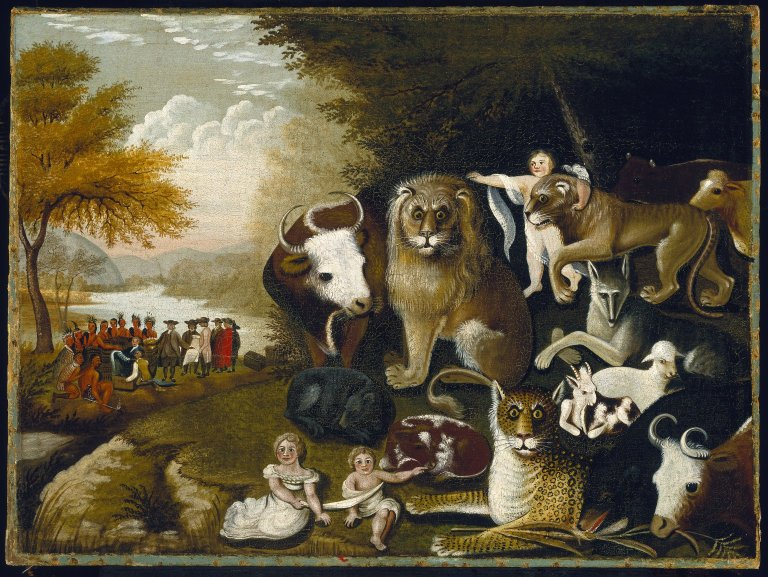
Edward Hicks, The Peaceable Kingdom, c. 1830–1840

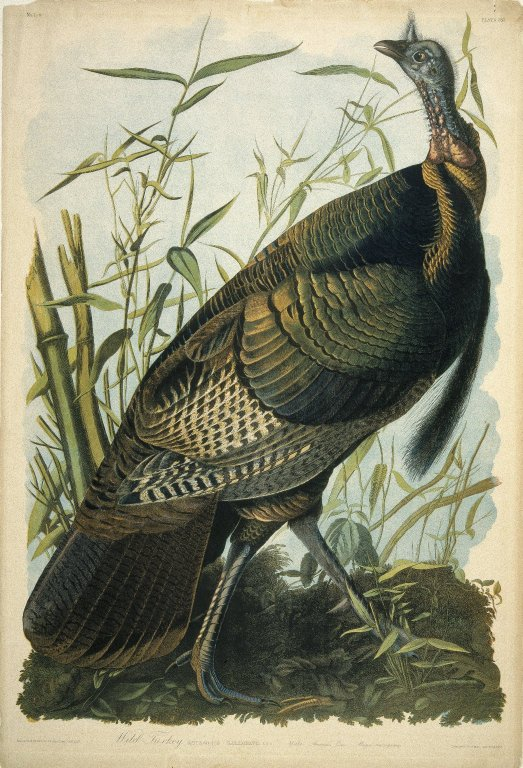
John J. Audubon, Wild Turkey, lithograph, c. 1861

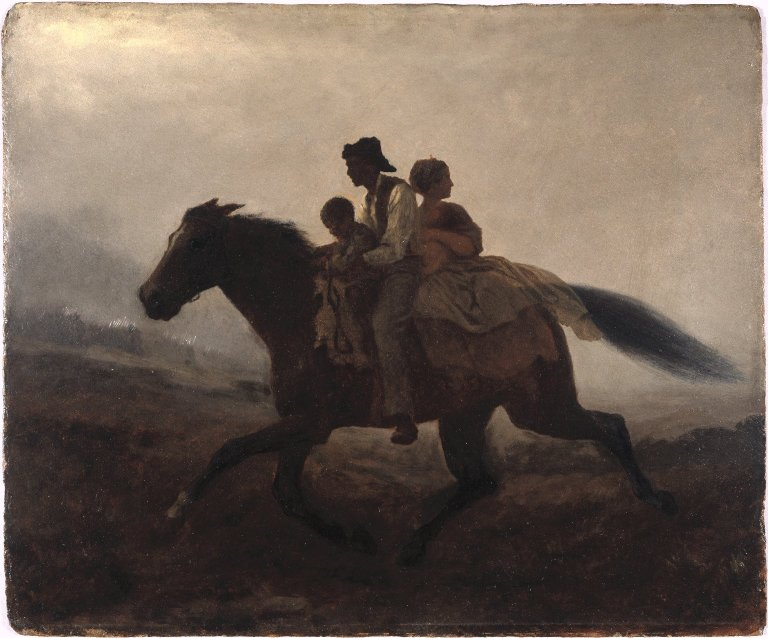
Eastman Johnson, A Ride for Liberty – The Fugitive Slaves, c. 1862

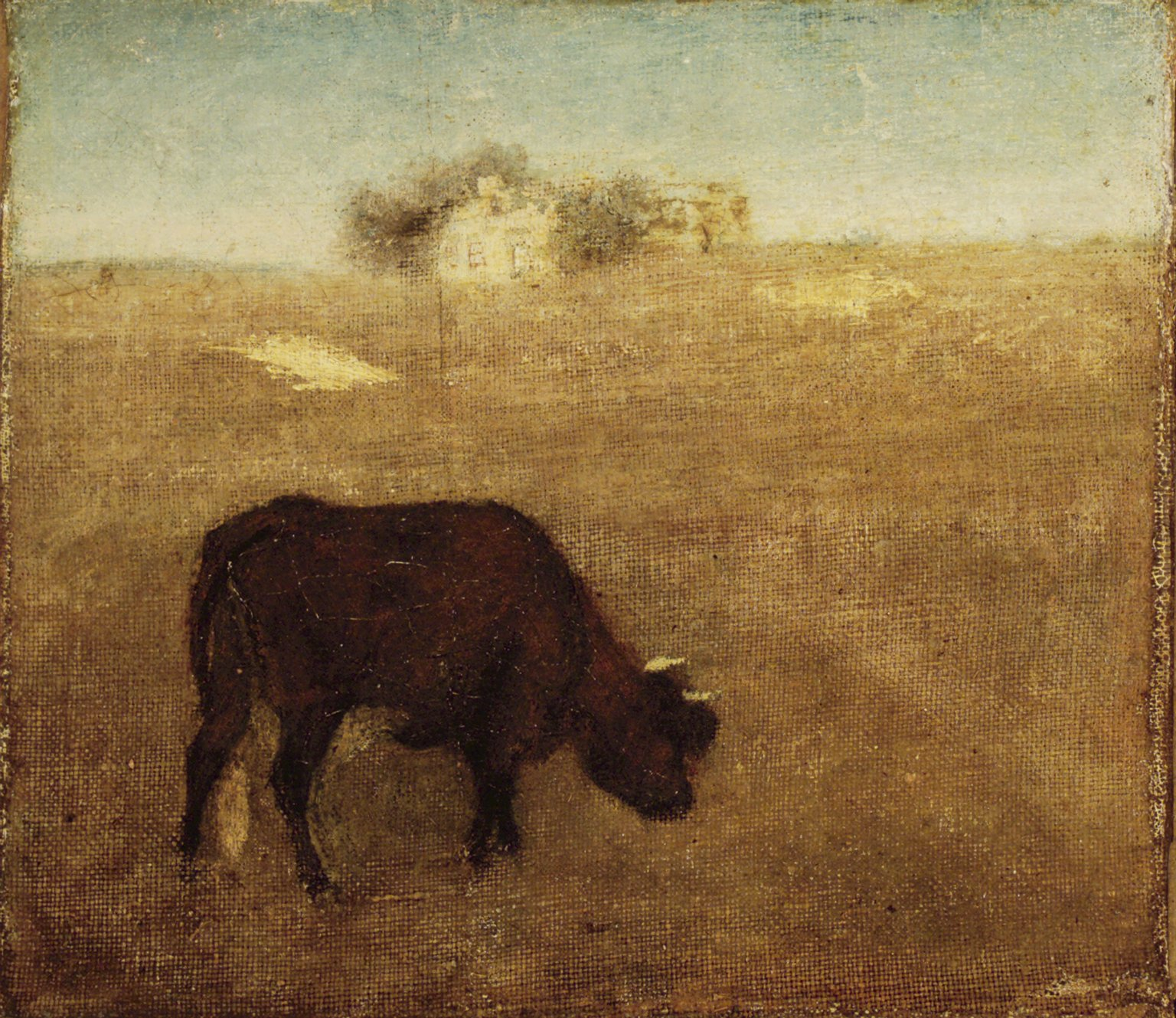
Albert Pinkham Ryder, Evening Glow The Old Red Cow, 1870–1875

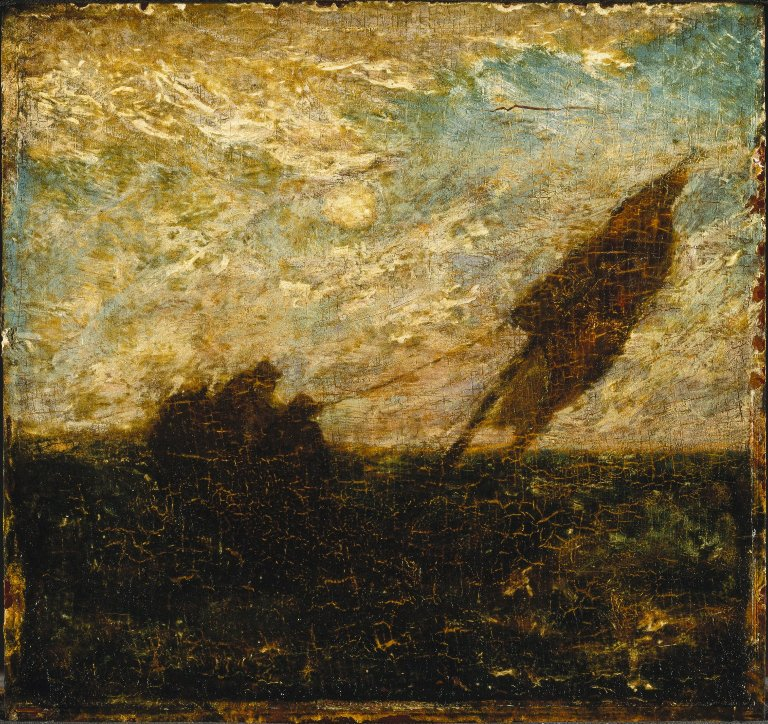
Albert Pinkham Ryder, The Waste of Waters is Their Field, 1880

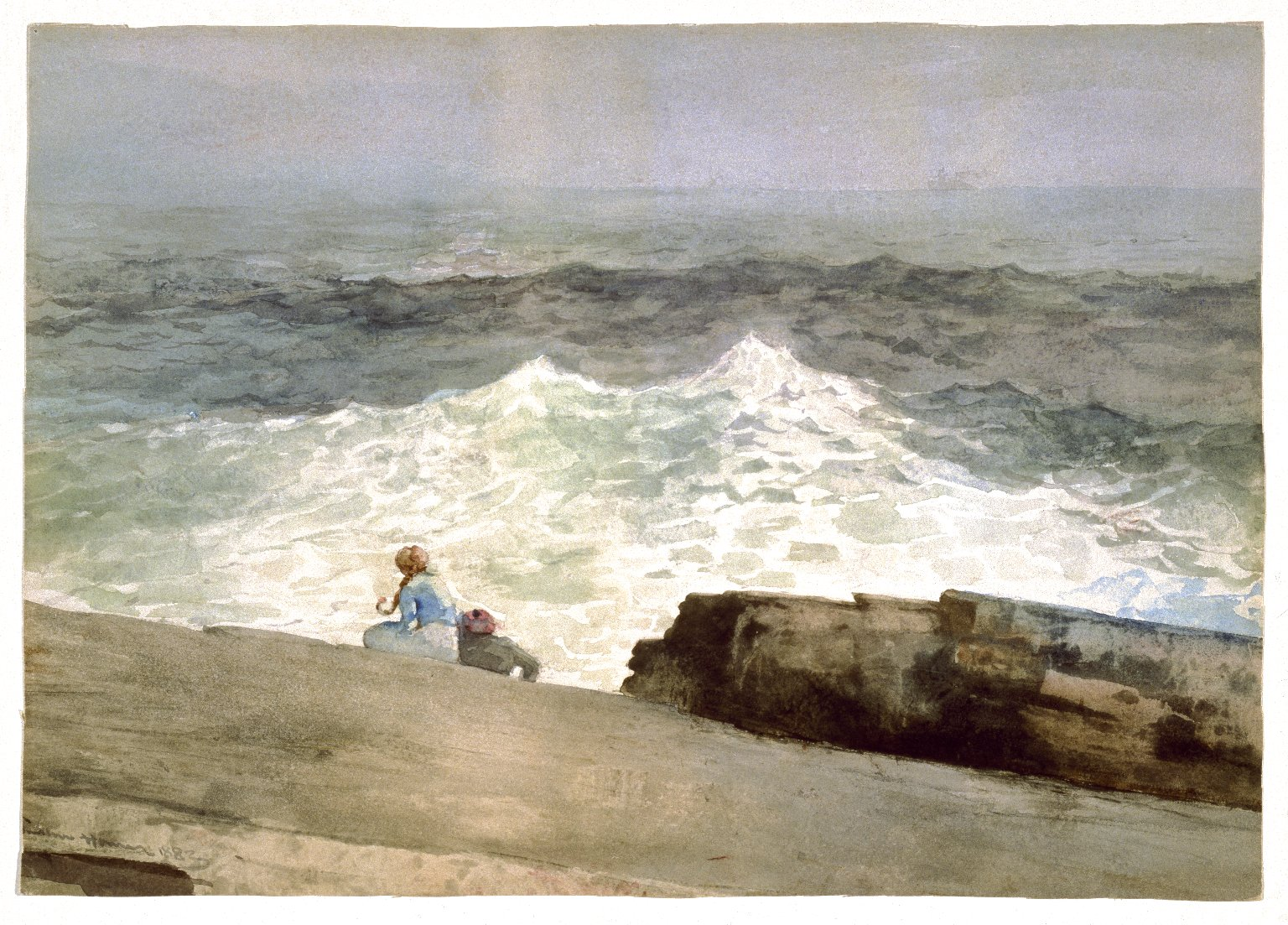
Winslow Homer, The Northeaster, c. 1883

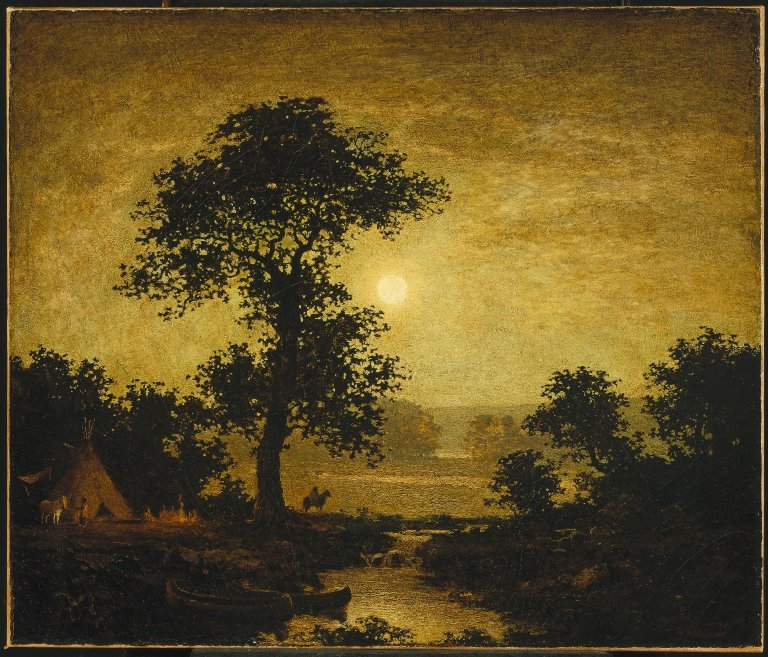
Ralph Albert Blakelock, Moonlight, 1885

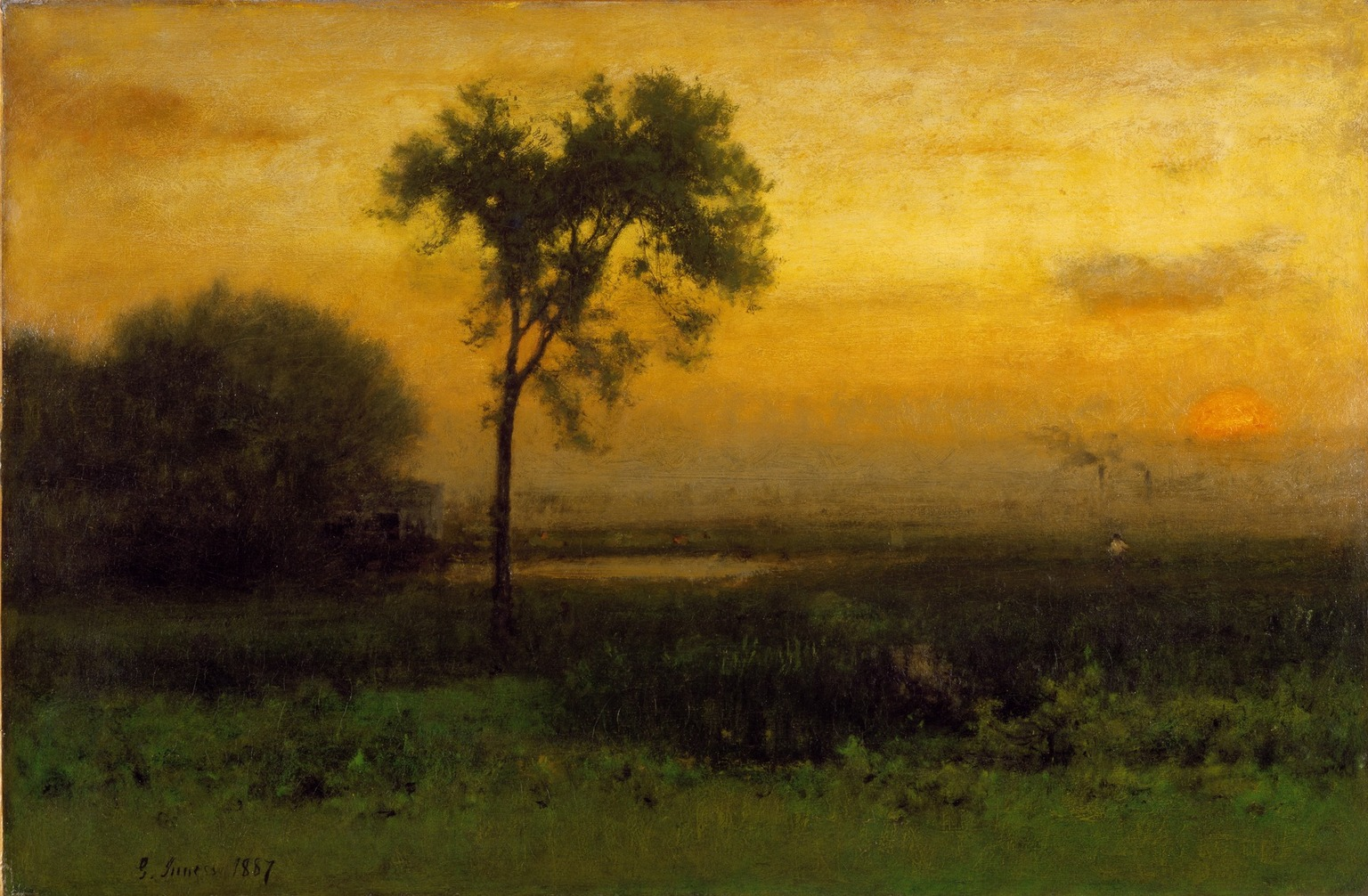
George Inness, Sunrise, 1887

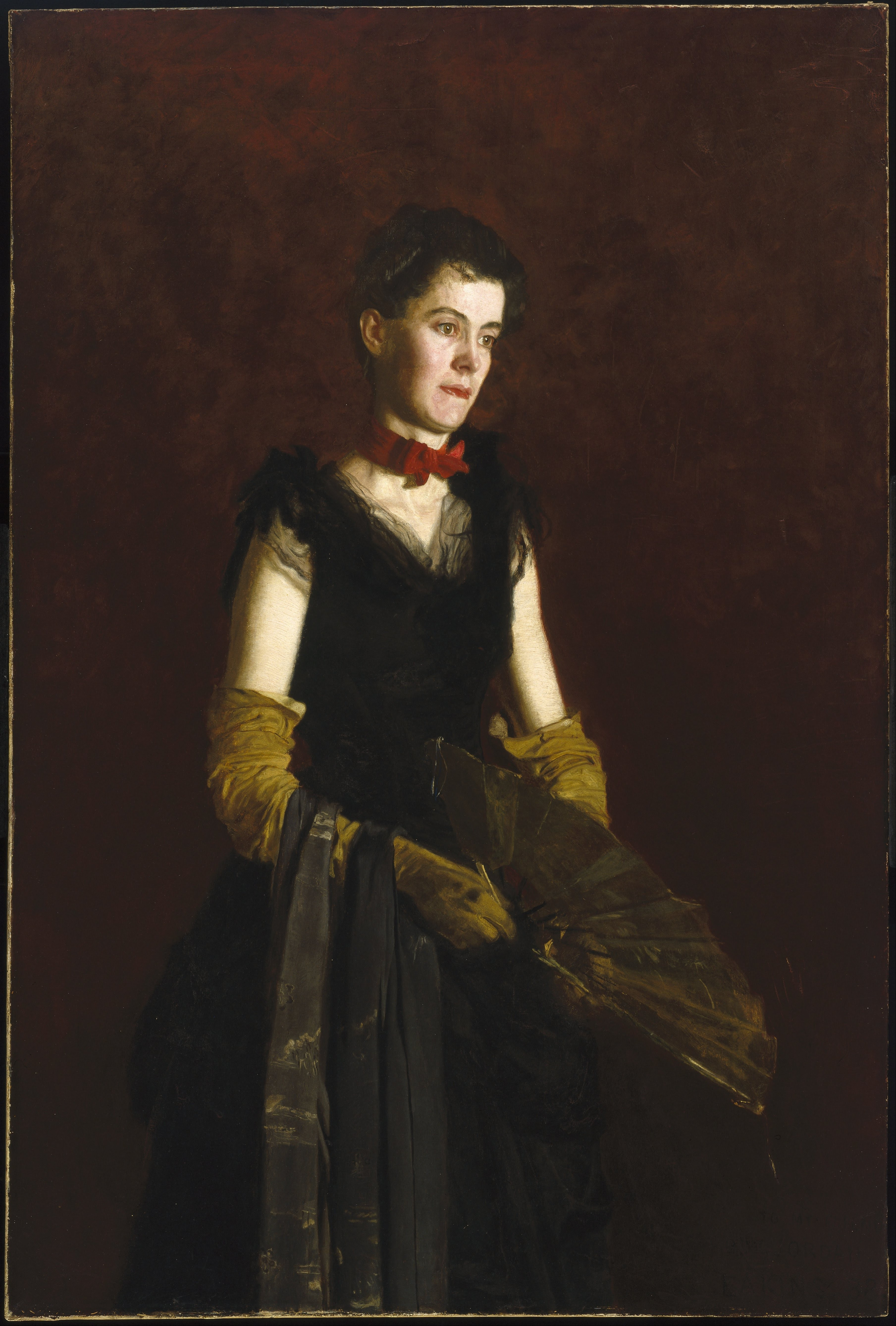
Thomas Eakins, Letitia Wilson Jordan, 1888

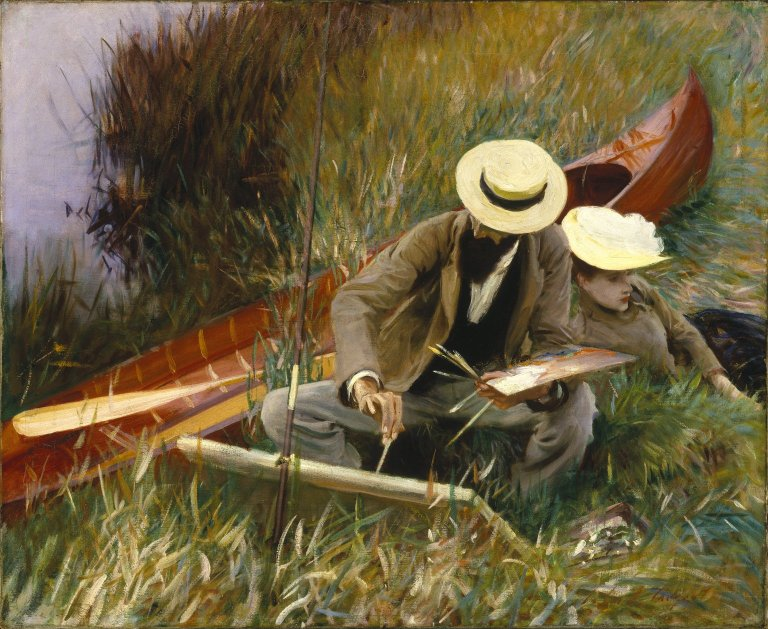
John Singer Sargent, Paul César Helleu Sketching with His Wife, 1889

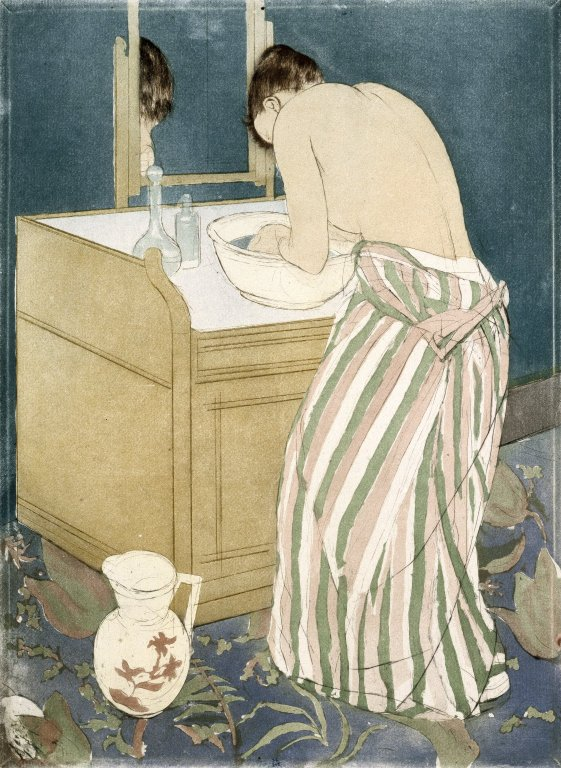
Mary Cassatt, La Toilette, c. 1889–1894

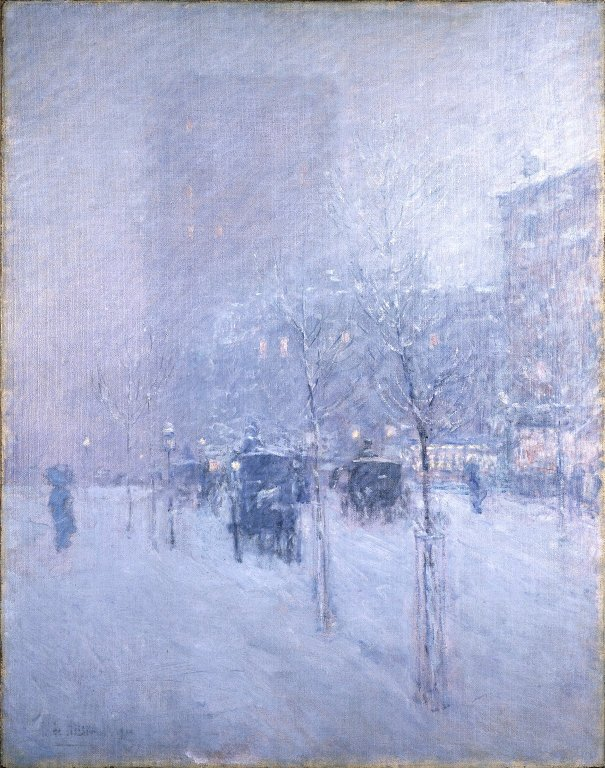
Childe Hassam, Late Afternoon, New York, Winter, c. 1900

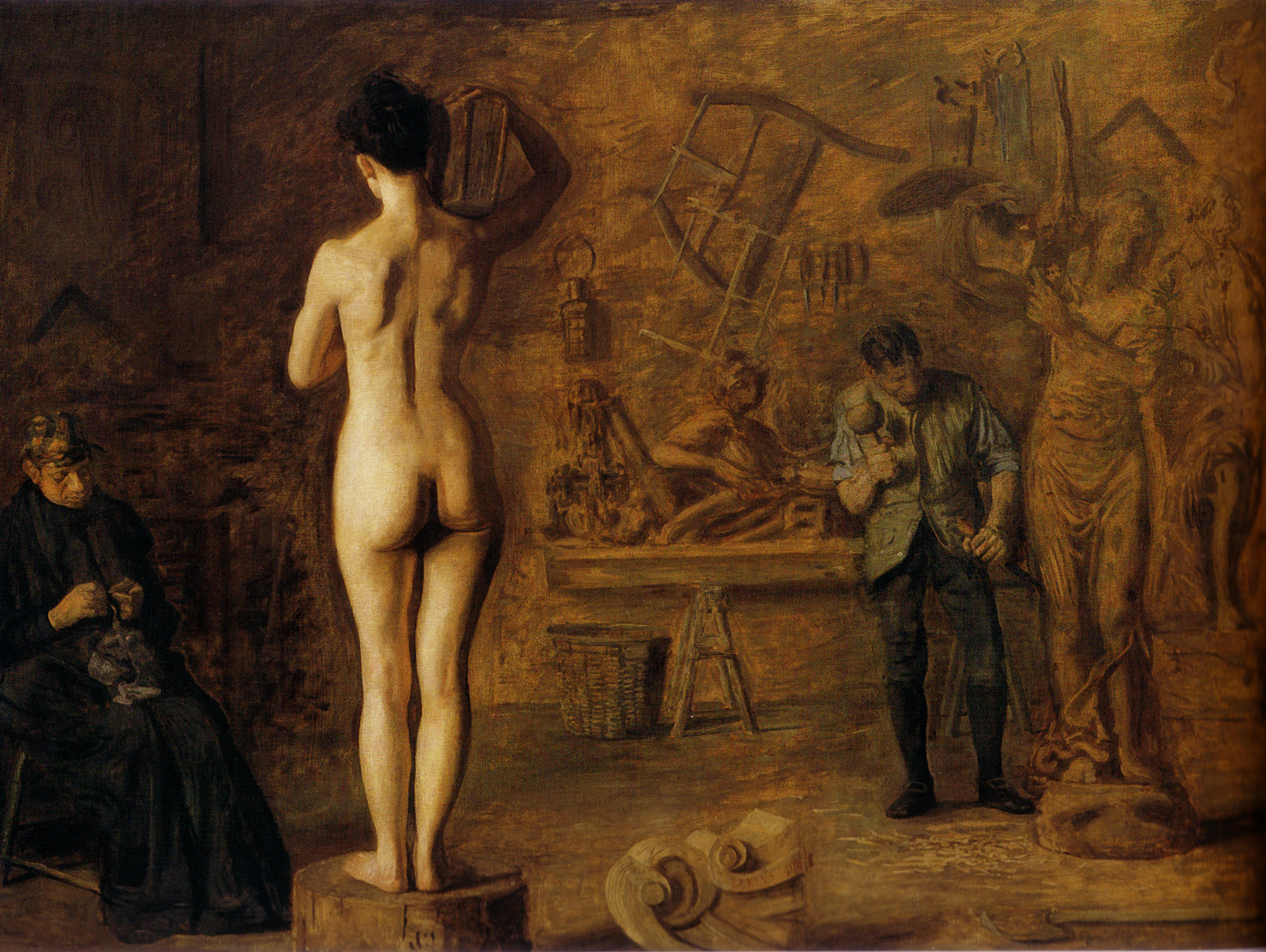
Thomas Eakins, William Rush Carving his Allegorical Figure of the Schuylkill River, 1908

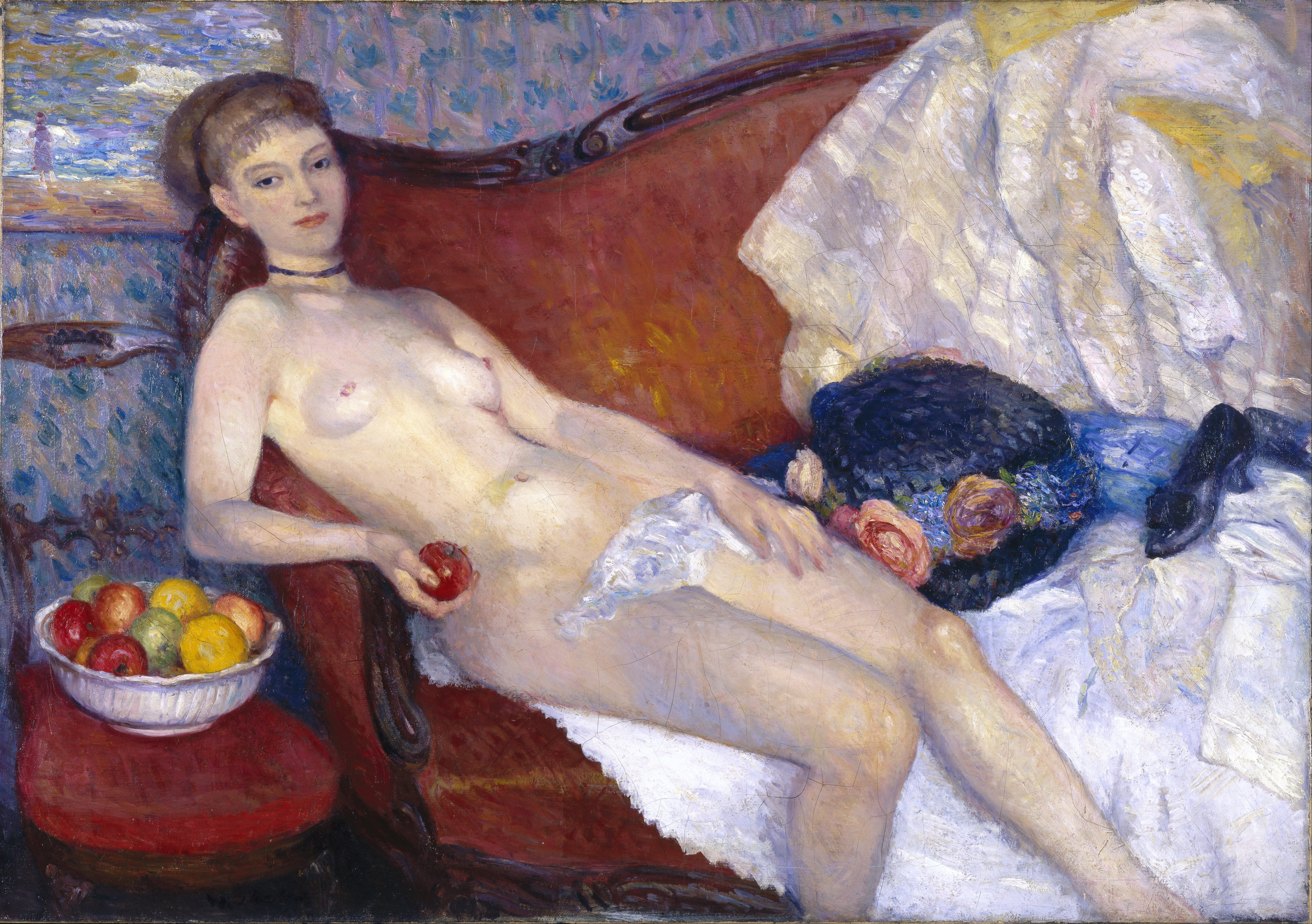
William Glackens, Nude with Apple, 1909–1910

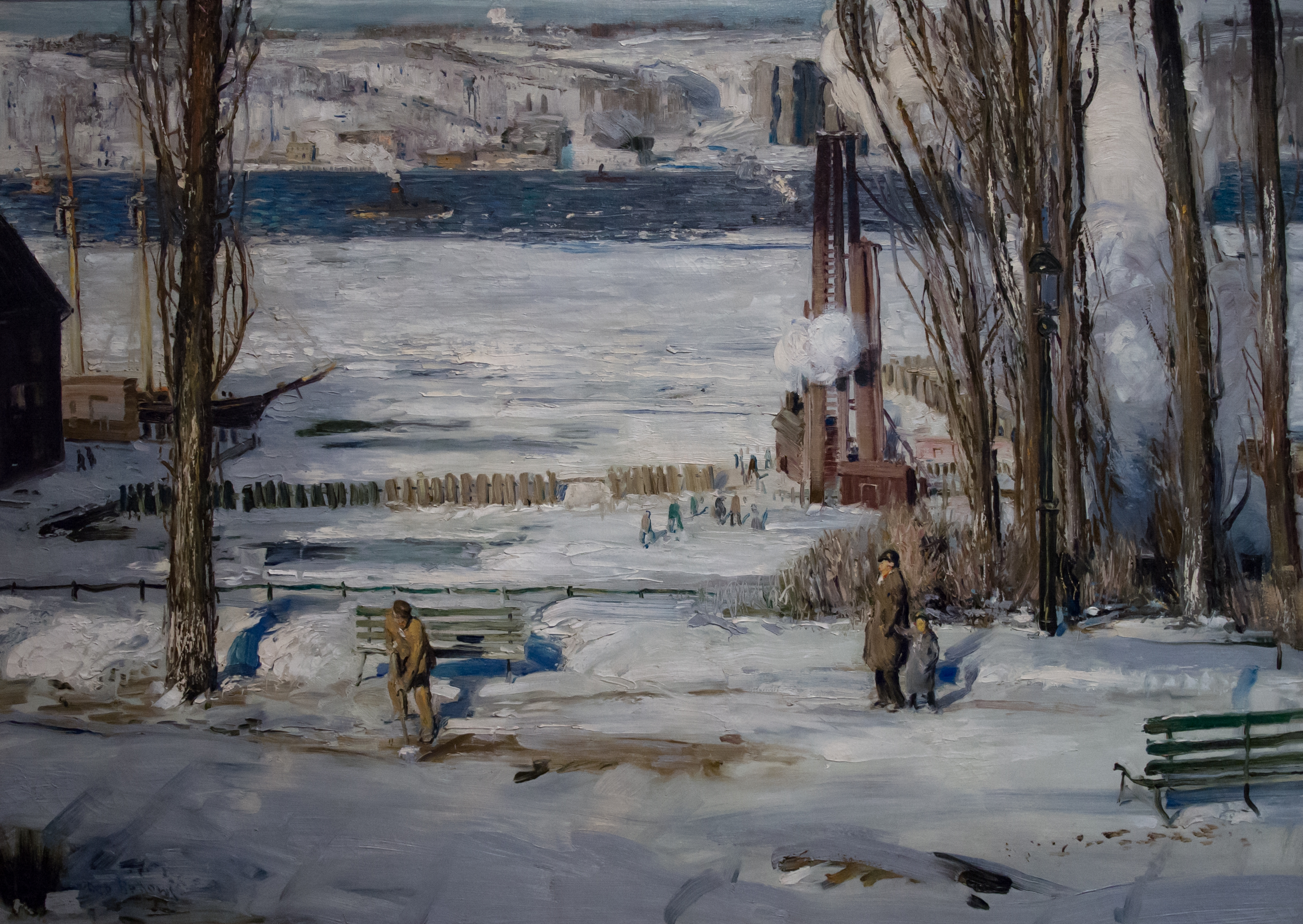
George Bellows, A Morning Snow – Hudson River, 1910

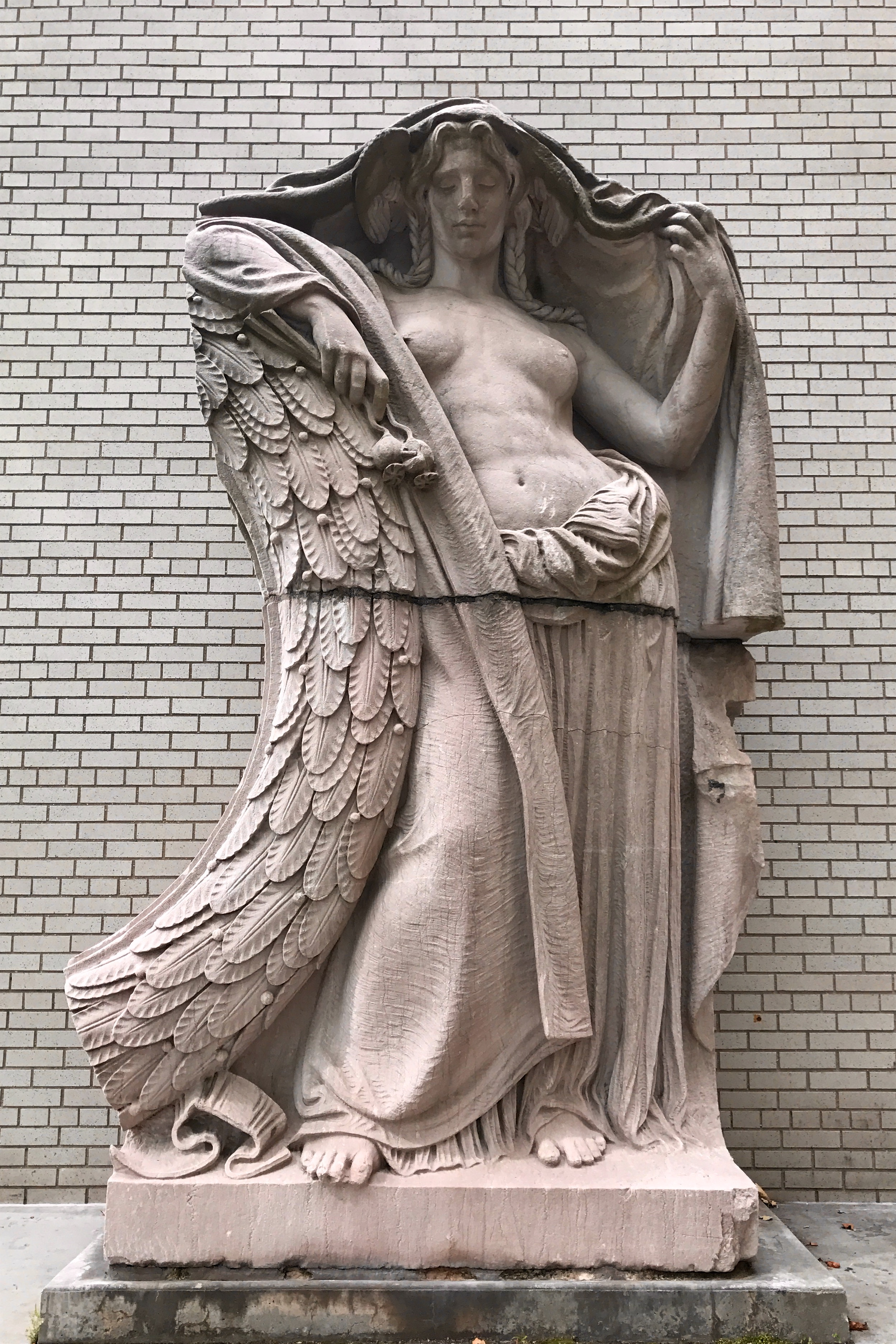
Adolph Weinman, Night, c. 1910

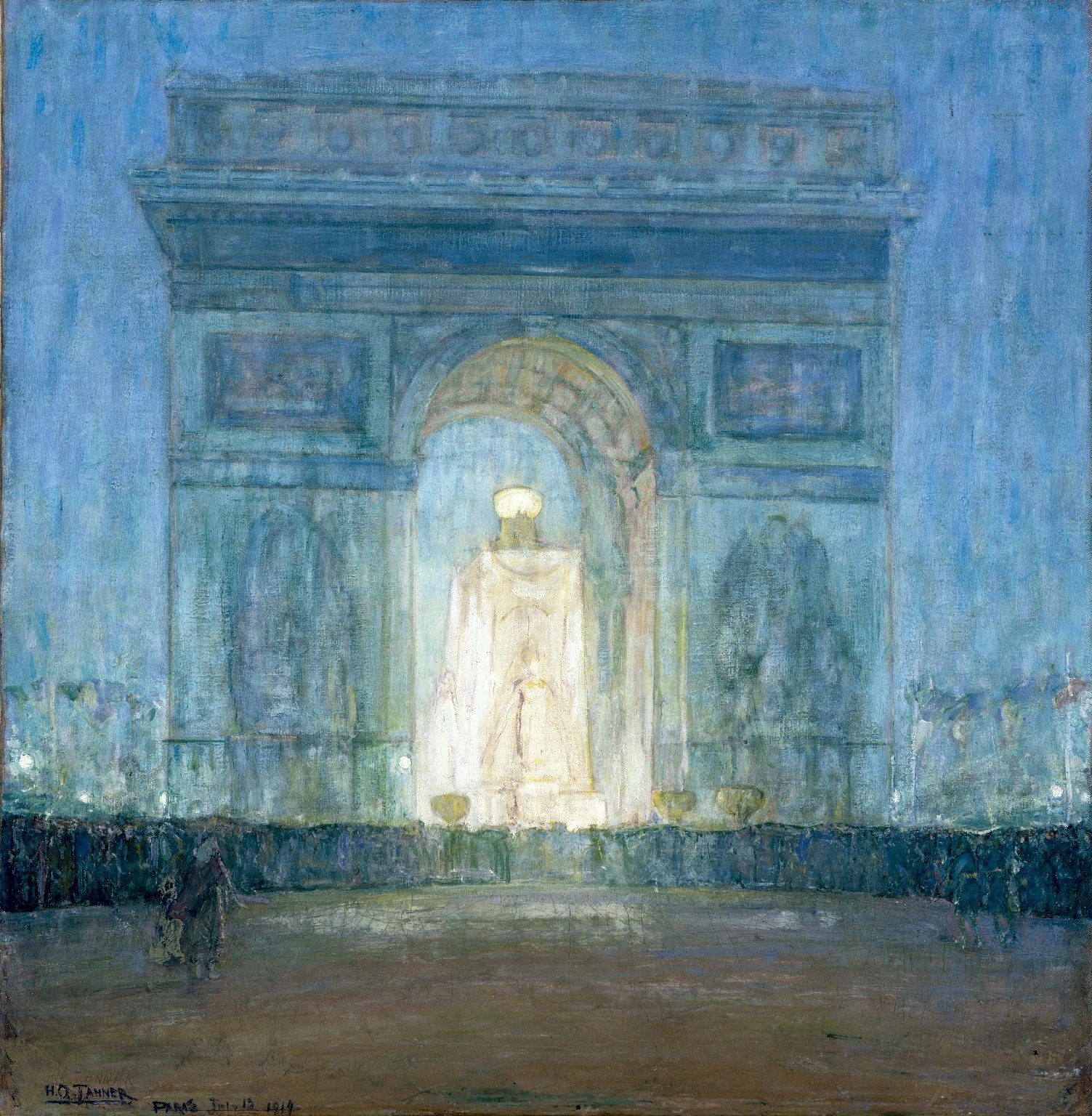
Henry Ossawa Tanner, The Arch, c. 1914

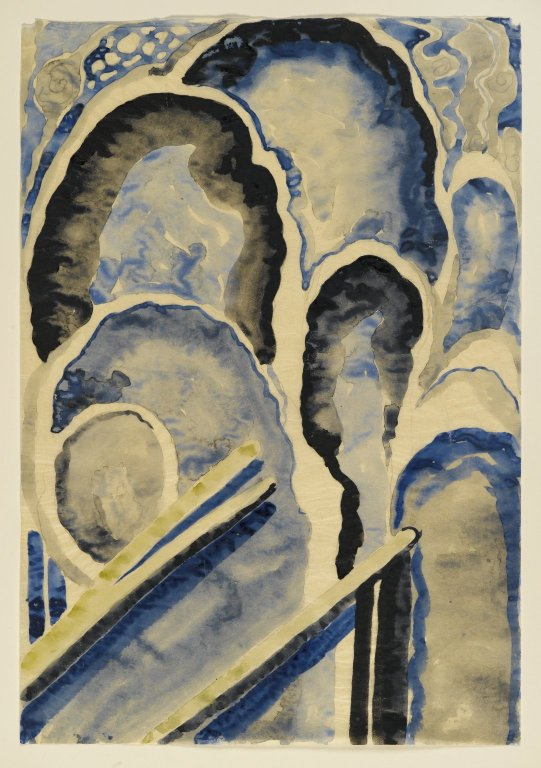
Georgia O'Keeffe, Blue 1, 1916

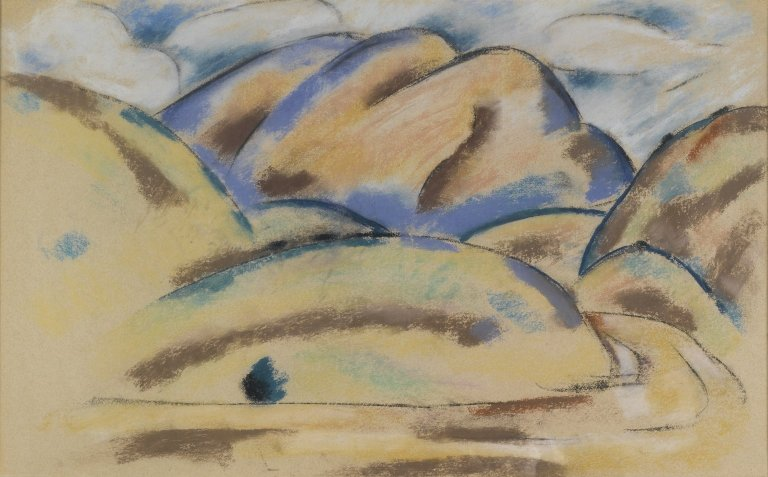
Marsden Hartley, Landscape, New Mexico, 1916–1920

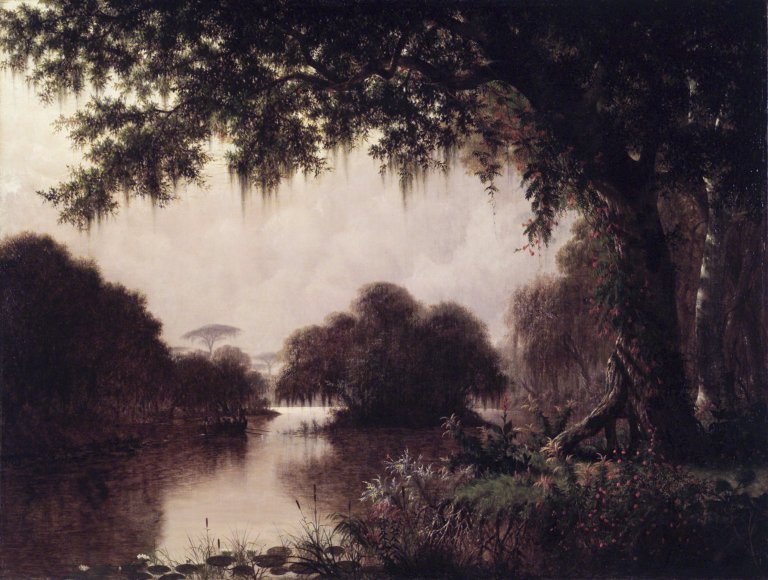
Joseph Rusling Meeker, The Acadians in the Achafalaya, "Evangeline", 1871

=== Asian art ===
In 2019, the museum reopened its Japanese and Chinese exhibits, after reinstalling its Korean section in 2017. The Chinese section offers pieces from more than 5,000 years of Chinese art and shows contemporary pieces on a regular schedule. The Japanese gallery, with its 7,000 pieces, is the largest of the museum's Asian collection and is known for its works from the Ainu people. The museum also possesses a special edition of One Hundred Famous Views of Edo that incorporates special metallic dust. It was donated to the museum in the 1930s, unbound in the 1970s, put on display in 2000, and then displayed again in 2024. The museum is also home to works from Bhutan, India, Nepal, Pakistan and southeast Asia.

=== Arts of Africa ===
The oldest acquisitions in the African art collection were collected by the museum in 1900, shortly after the museum's founding. The collection was expanded in 1922 with items originating largely in what is now the Democratic Republic of the Congo. The next year, the museum hosted one of the first exhibitions of African art in the United States, when Stewart Culin of the museum's new Department of Ethnology started displaying 1,400 pieces.

The Brooklyn Museum's African art collection includes more than 6,000 objects. The African art collection covers 2,500 years of human history and includes sculpture, jewelry, masks, and religious artifacts from more than 100 African cultures. Noteworthy items in this collection include a carved ndop figure of a Kuba king, believed to be among the oldest extant ndop carvings, and a Lulua mother-and-child figure.

In 2018, the museum drew criticism from groups including Decolonize This Place for its hiring of a white woman as Consulting Curator of African Arts. As part of the 2026–2027 renovation of the African art galleries, the art was to be rearranged based on the geographical regions from which they originated.

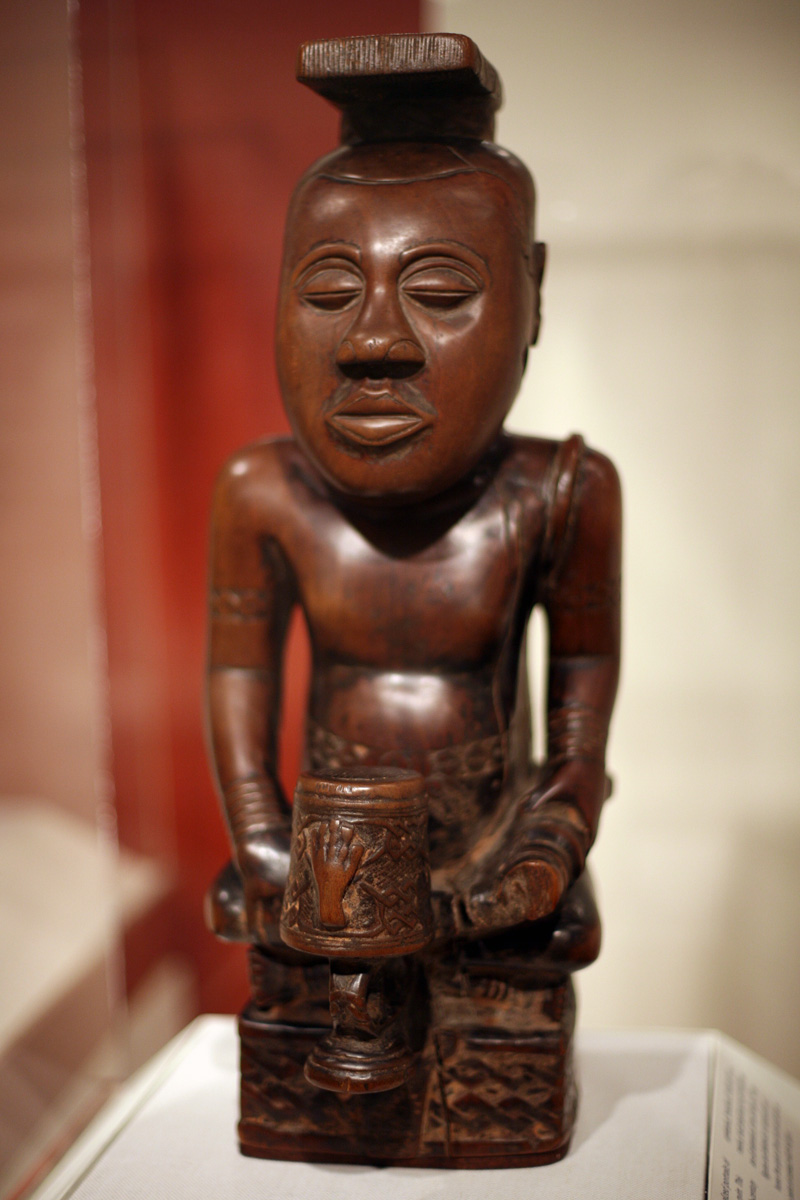
Kuba Ndop portrait

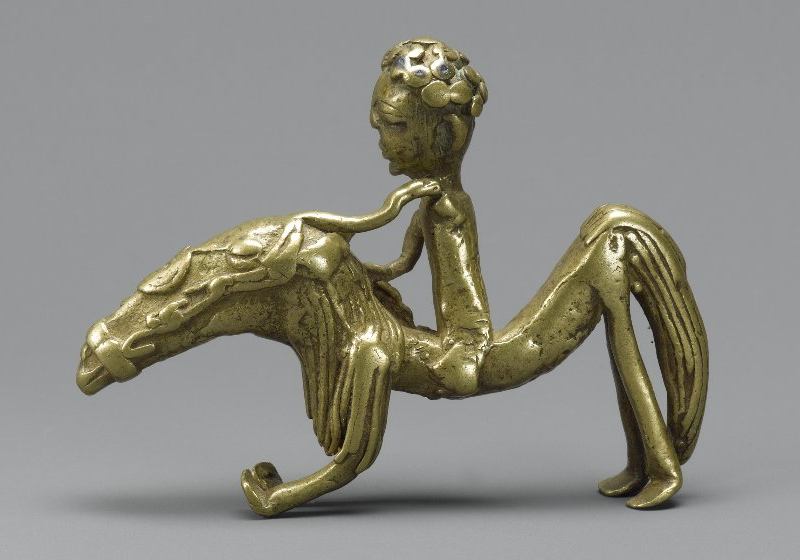
Golden rider of the Ashanti region culture in Ghana

=== Arts of the Pacific Islands ===
The museum's collection of Pacific Islands art began in 1900 with the acquisition of 100 wooden figures and shadow puppets from New Guinea and the Dutch East Indies (now Indonesia); since that base, the collection has grown to encompass close to 5,000 works. Art in this collection is sourced to numerous Pacific and Indian Ocean islands including Hawaii and New Zealand, as well as less-populous islands such as Rapa Nui and Vanuatu. Many of the Marquesan items in the collection were acquired by the museum from famed Norwegian explorer Thor Heyerdahl.

Art objects in this collection are crafted from a wide variety of materials. The museum lists "coconut fiber, feathers, shells, clay, bone, human hair, wood, moss, and spider webs" as among the materials used to make artworks that include masks, tapa cloths, sculpture, and jewelry.

=== Arts of the Islamic world ===
The museum also has art objects and historical texts produced by Muslim artists or about Muslim figures and cultures.

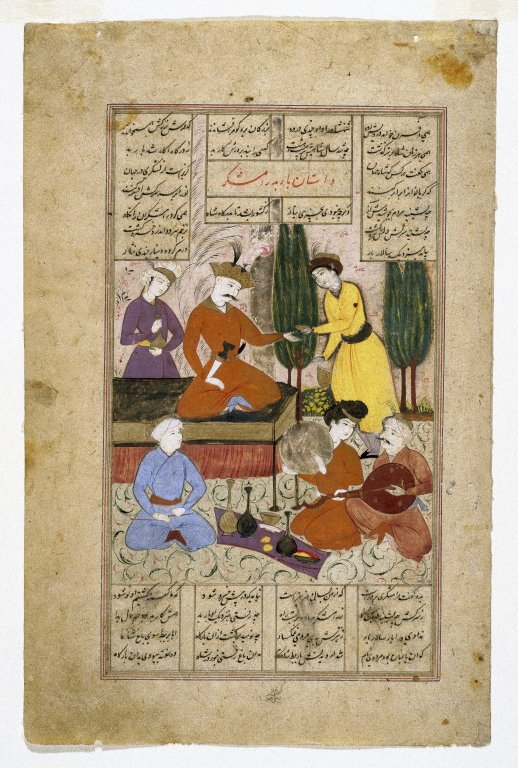
Bahram Gur and Courtiers Entertained by Barbad the Musician, page from Shahnama of Ferdowsi

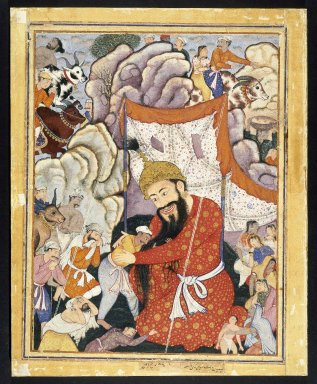
Zumurrud Shah Takes Refuge in the Mountains, ca. 1570

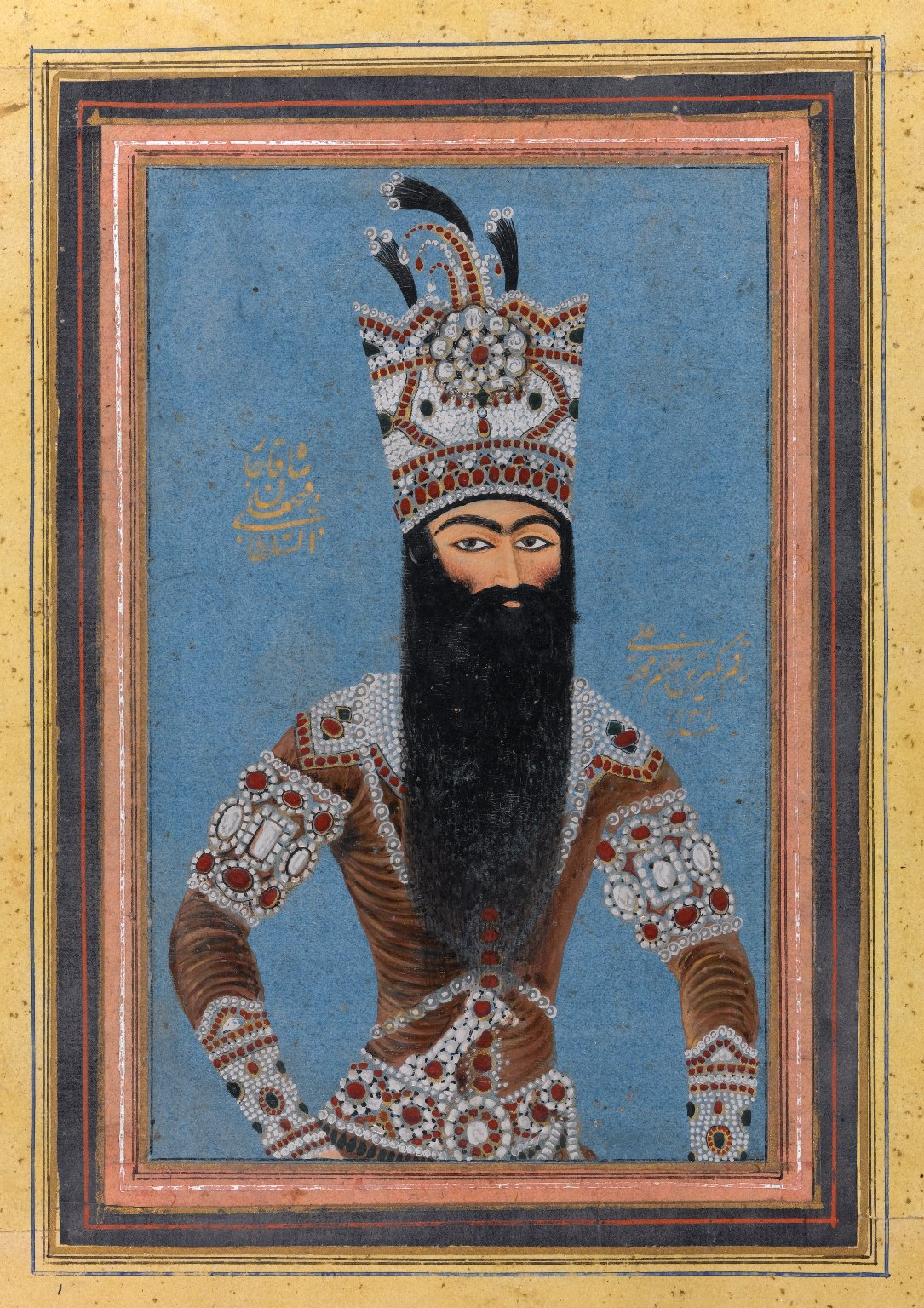
Mihr 'Ali (Iranian, active ca. 1800–1830). Portrait of Fath-Ali Shah Qajar, 1815.

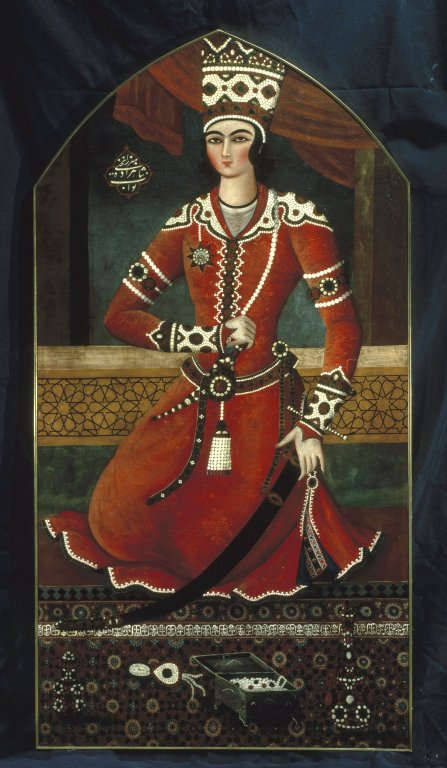
Muhammad Hasan (Persian, active 1808–1840). Prince Yahya, ca. 1830s.

=== The Jarvis Collection of Native American Plains Art ===
The Museum has a collection of Native America Artifacts acquired by Dr. Nathan Sturges Jarvis (surgeon) who was stationed at Fort Snelling, Minnesota 1833–1836.

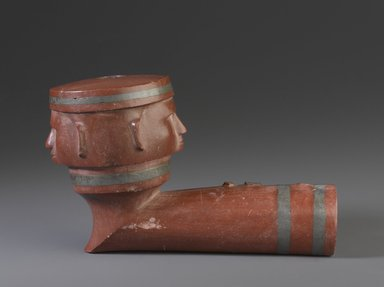
Inlaid pipe bowl with two faces collected at Fort Snelling 1833-1836

=== Elizabeth A. Sackler Center for Feminist Art ===
The museum's center for feminist art opened in 2007. Spanning 8,300 square feet (770 m^{2}), it is dedicated to preserving the history of the movement since the late 20th century, as well as raising awareness of feminist contributions to art, and informing the future of this area of artistic dialogue. Along with an exhibition space and library, the center features a gallery housing a masterwork by Judy Chicago, a large installation called The Dinner Party (1974–1979).

=== European art ===
The Brooklyn Museum has among others late Gothic and Early Italian Renaissance paintings by Lorenzo di Niccolo ("Scenes from the life of Saint Lawrence"), Sano di Pietro, Nardo di Cione, Lorenzo Monaco, Donato de' Bardi ("Saint Jerome"), Giovanni Bellini. It has Dutch paintings by Frans Hals, Gerard Dou, and Thomas de Keyser as well as others. It has 19th-century French paintings by Charles Daubigny, Narcisse Virgilio Díaz, Eugène Boudin ("Port, Le Havre"), Berthe Morisot, Edgar Degas, Gustave Caillebotte ("Railway Bridge at Argenteuil"), Claude Monet ("Doges Palace, Venice"), the French sculptor Alfred Barye, Camille Pissarro, and Paul Cézanne as well as many others.

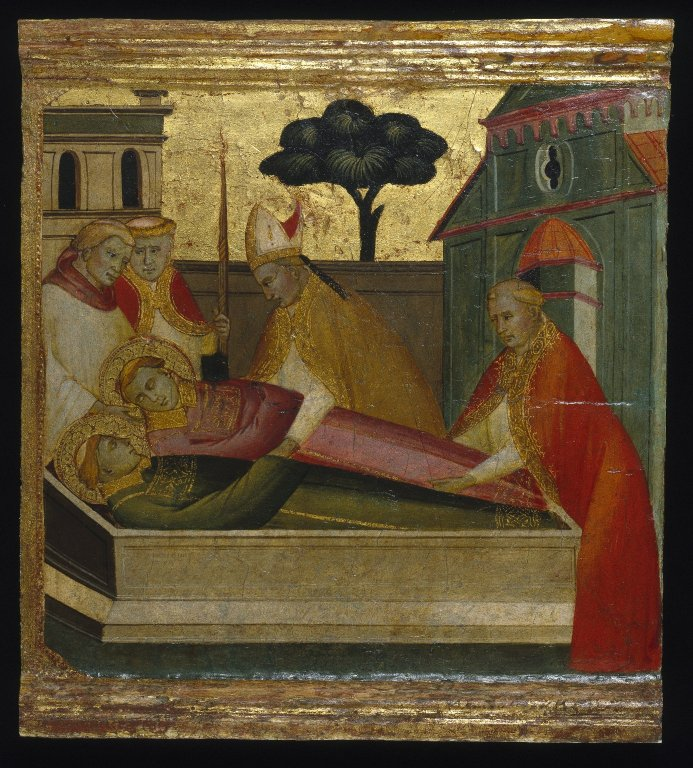
Lorenzo di Niccolò, Saint Lawrence Buried in Saint Stephen's Tomb, 1410–1414, tempera and tooled gold on poplar, 33 × 36 cm

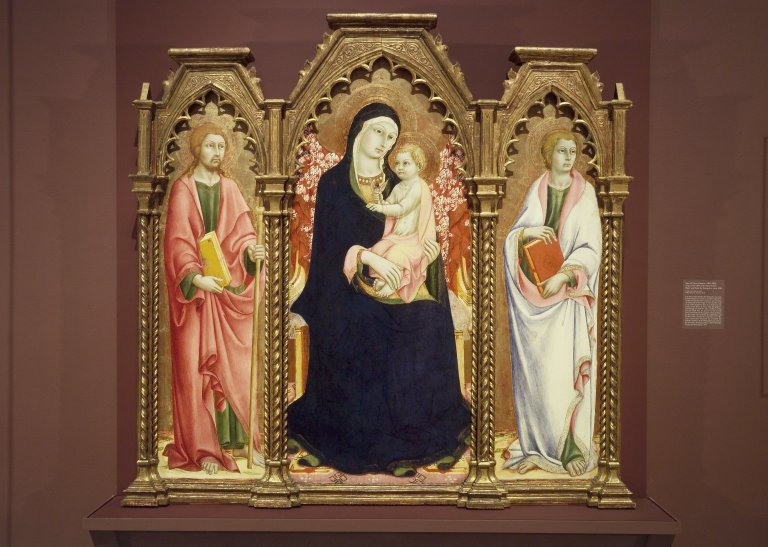
Sano di Pietro, Triptych of Madonna with Child, St. James and St. John the Evangelist, c. 1460 and 1462

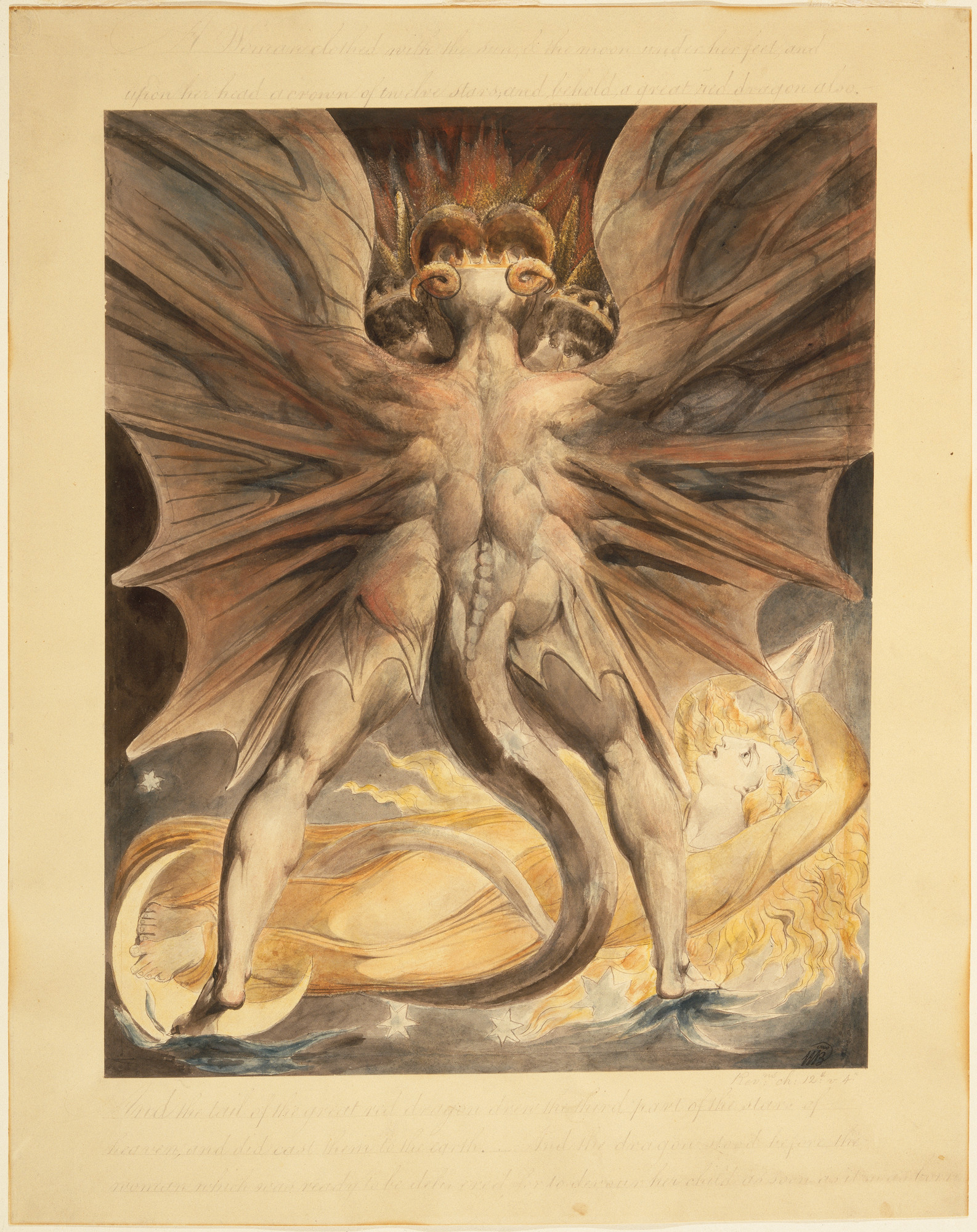
William Blake (British, 1757–1827) The Great Red Dragon and the Woman Clothed with the Sun (Rev. 12: 1–4), ca. 1803–1805

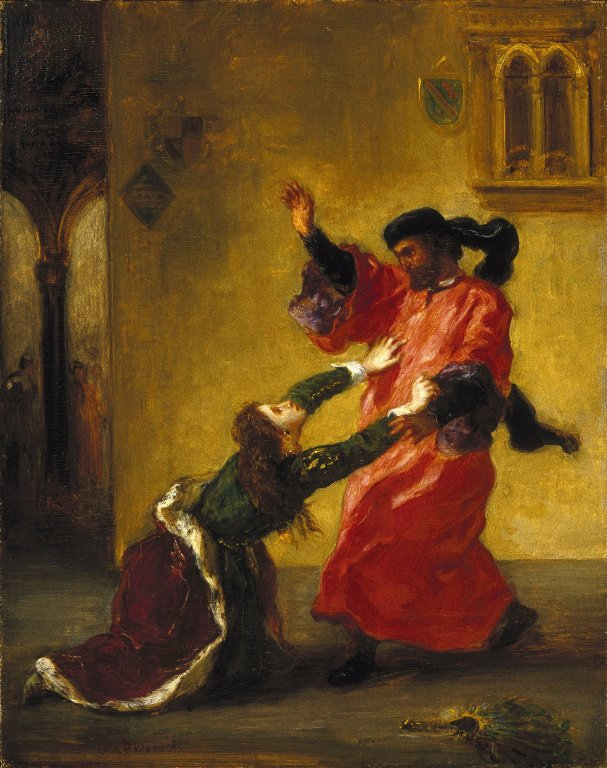
Eugène Delacroix, Desdemona Cursed by her Father (Desdemona maudite par son père), c. 1850–1854

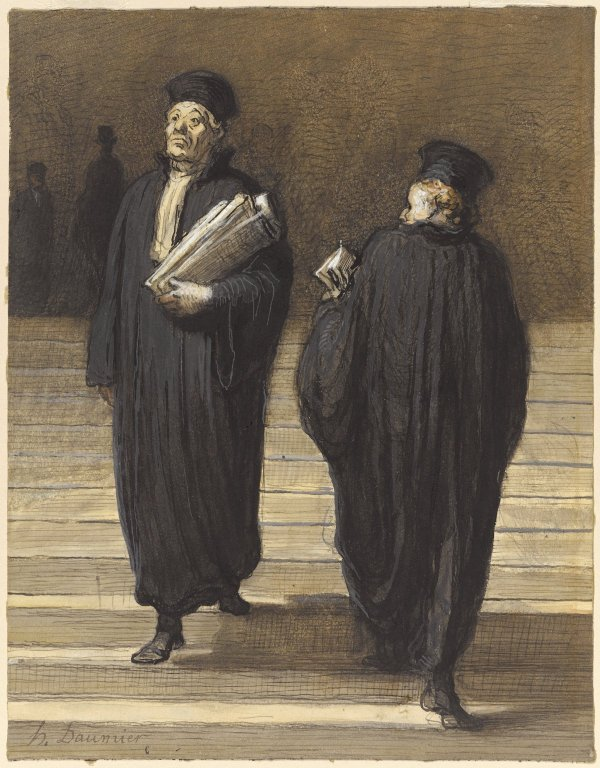
Honoré Daumier, The Two Colleagues (Lawyers) (Les deux confrères Avocats), between 1865 and 1870

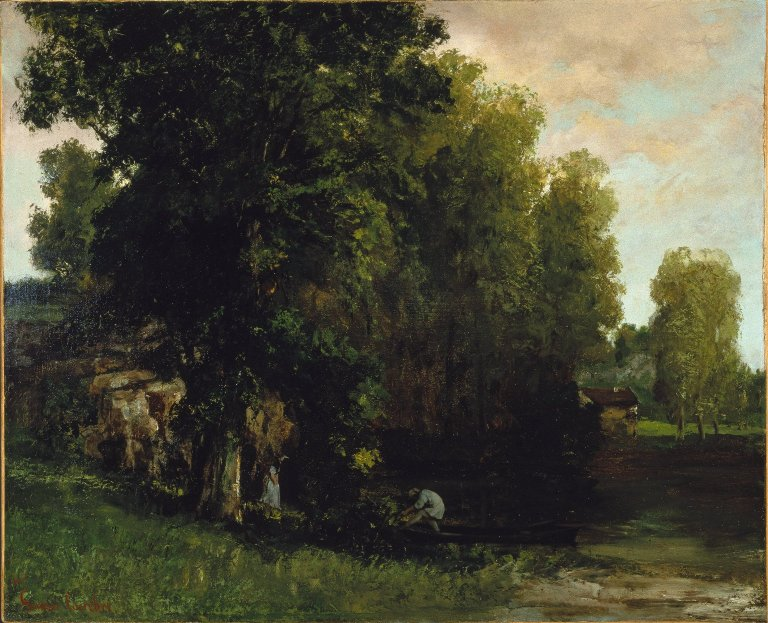
Gustave Courbet, The Edge of the Pool, 1867

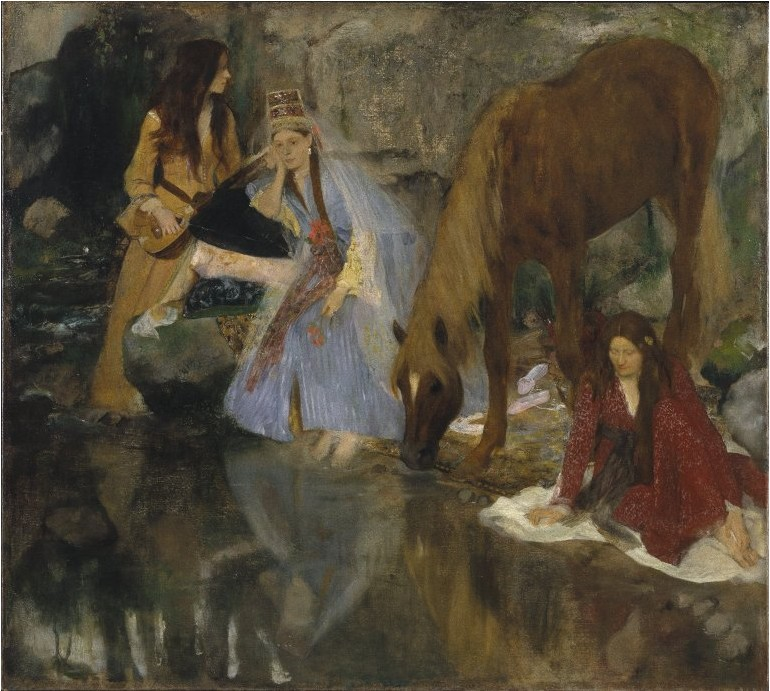
Edgar Degas, Portrait de Mlle Eugénie Fiocre, 1867–1868

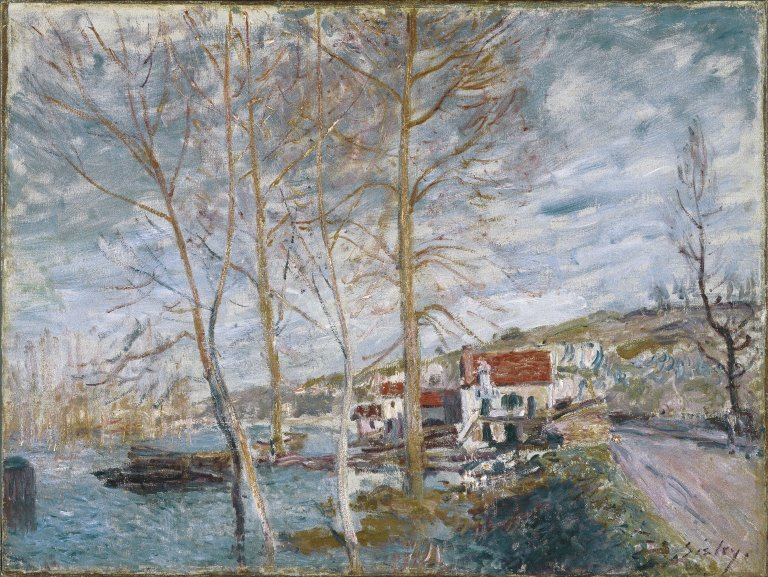
Alfred Sisley, Flood at Moret (Inondation à Moret), 1879

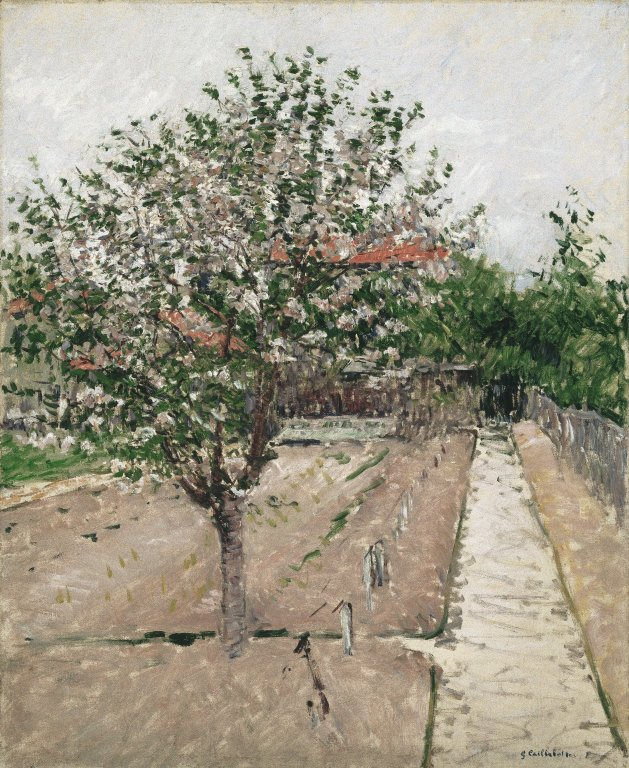
Gustave Caillebotte, Apple Tree in Bloom (Pommier en fleurs), c. 1885

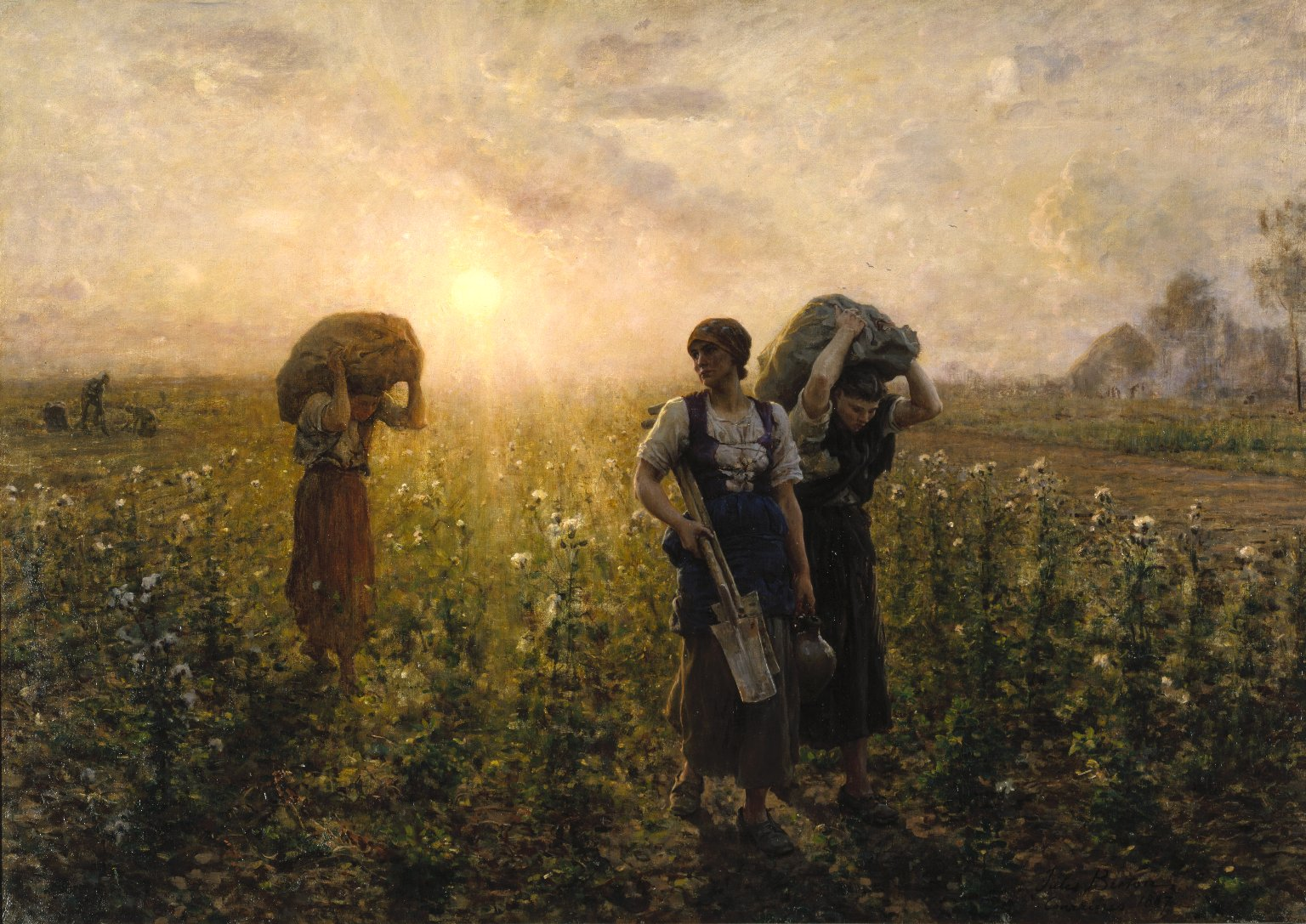
Jules Breton, Fin du travail (The End of the Working Day), c. 1886–1887

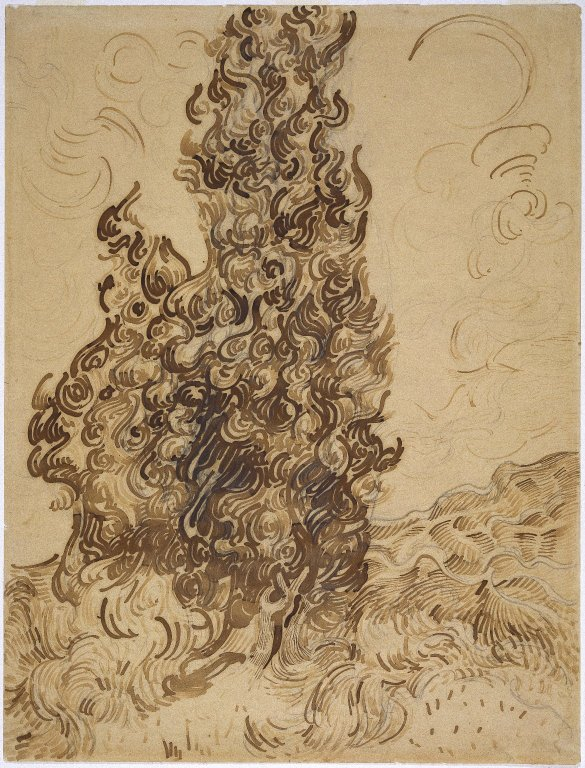
Vincent van Gogh, Cypresses (Les Cyprès), 1889, reed pen, graphite, quill, brown ink and black ink on white wove latune et cie balcons paper

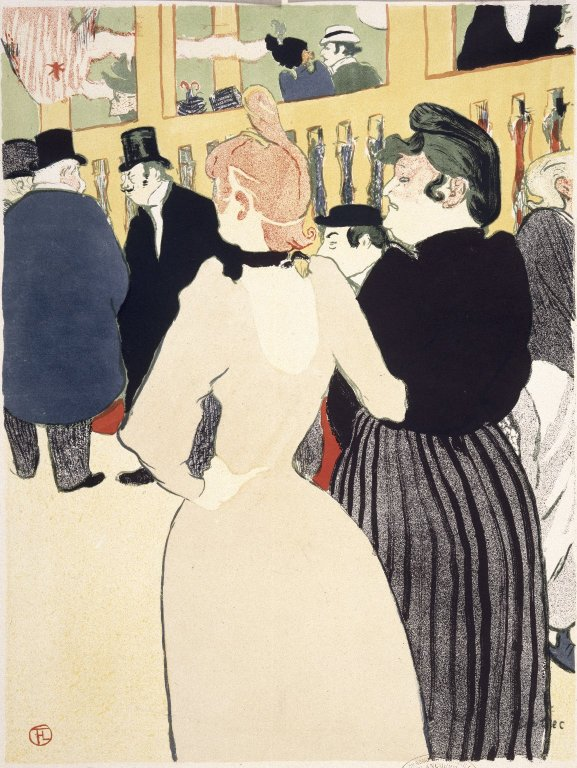
Henri de Toulouse-Lautrec, At the Moulin Rouge (Au Moulin Rouge), c. 1892

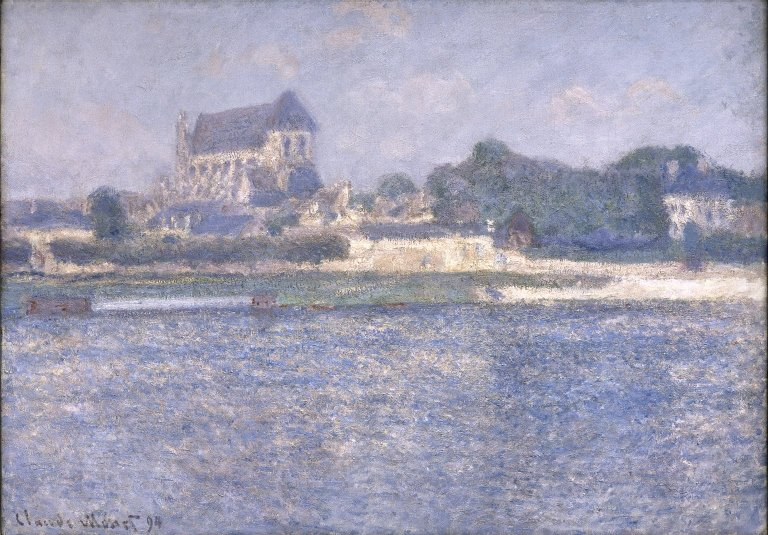
Claude Monet, The Church at Vernon, 1894

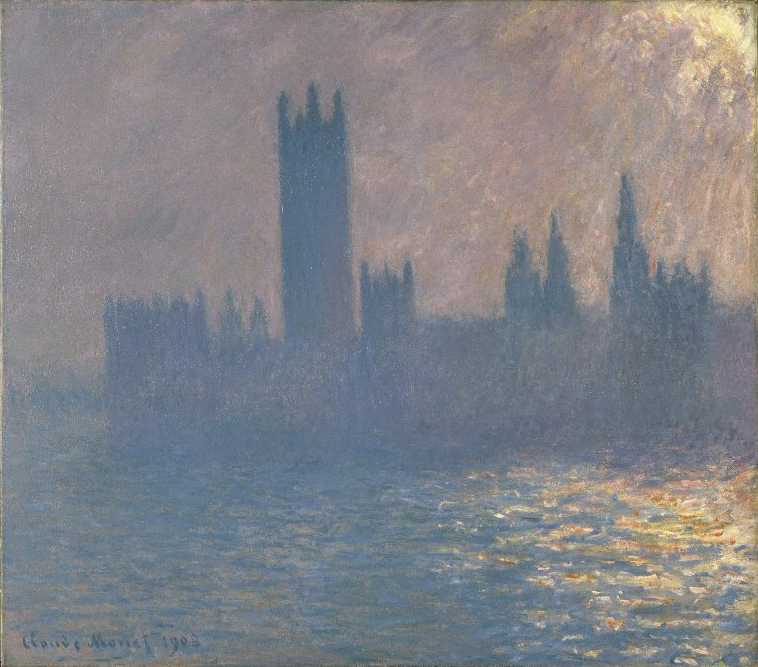
Claude Monet, Houses of Parliament Sunlight Effect (Le Parlement effet de soleil), 1903

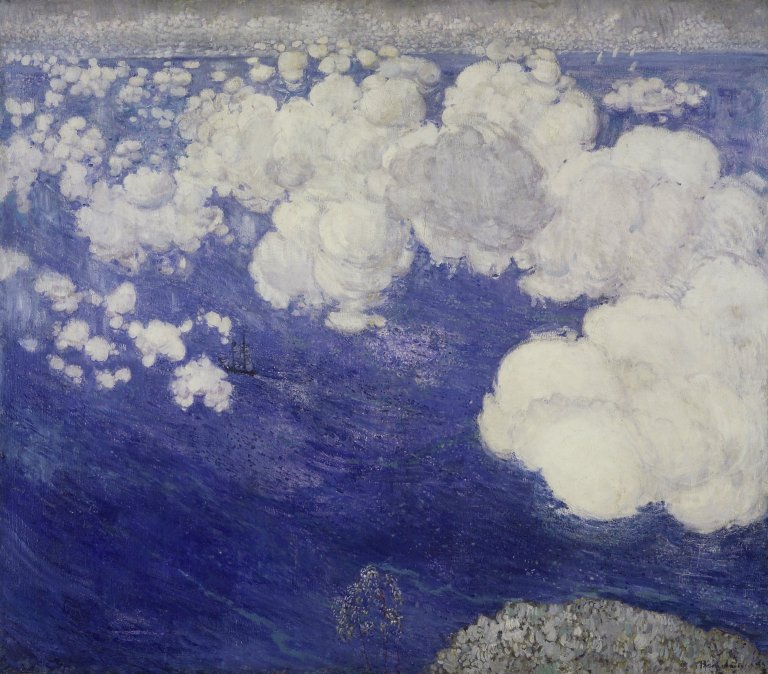
Boris Anisfeld, Clouds over the Black Sea - Crimea (1906)

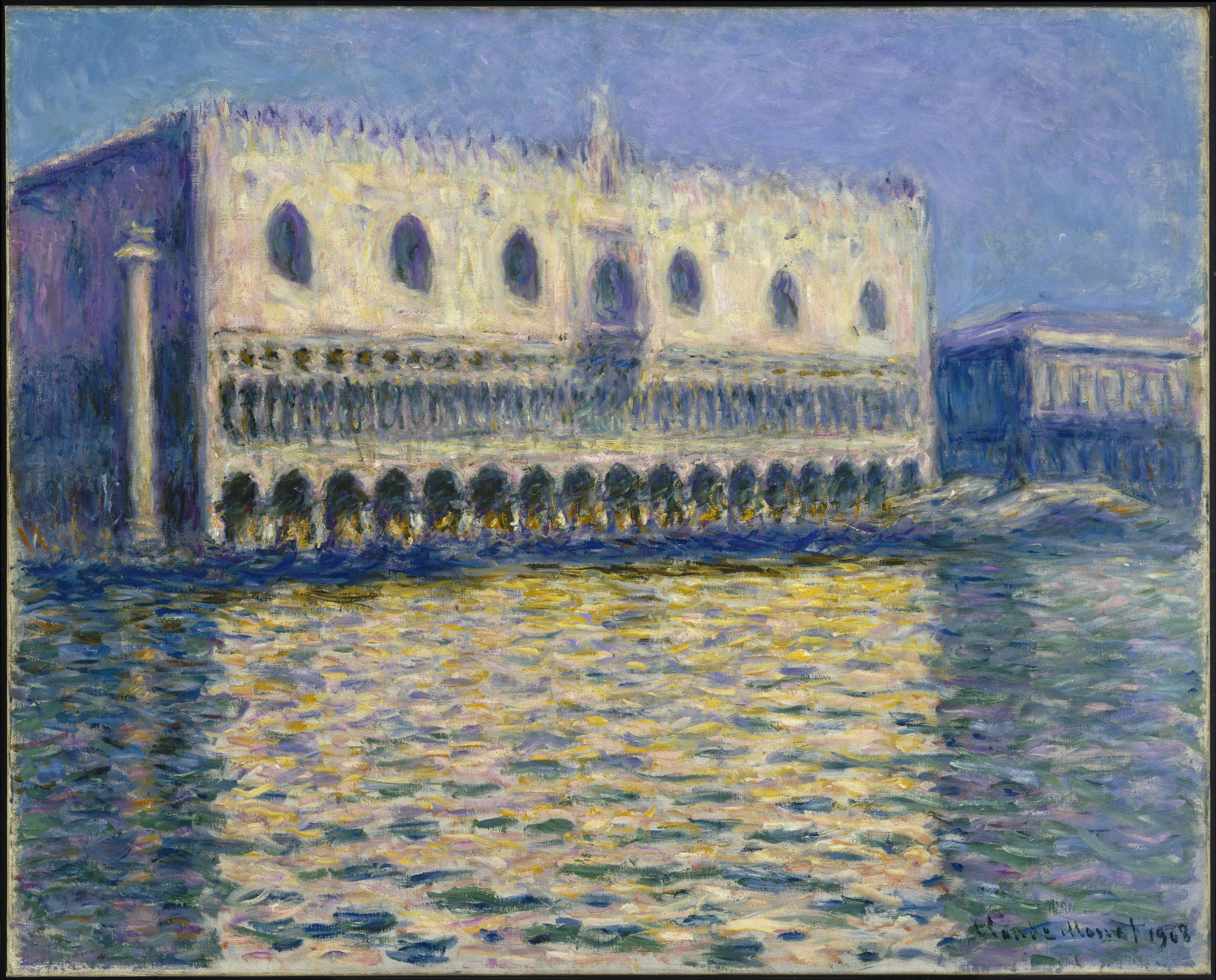
Claude Monet, The Doge's Palace (Le Palais ducal), 1908

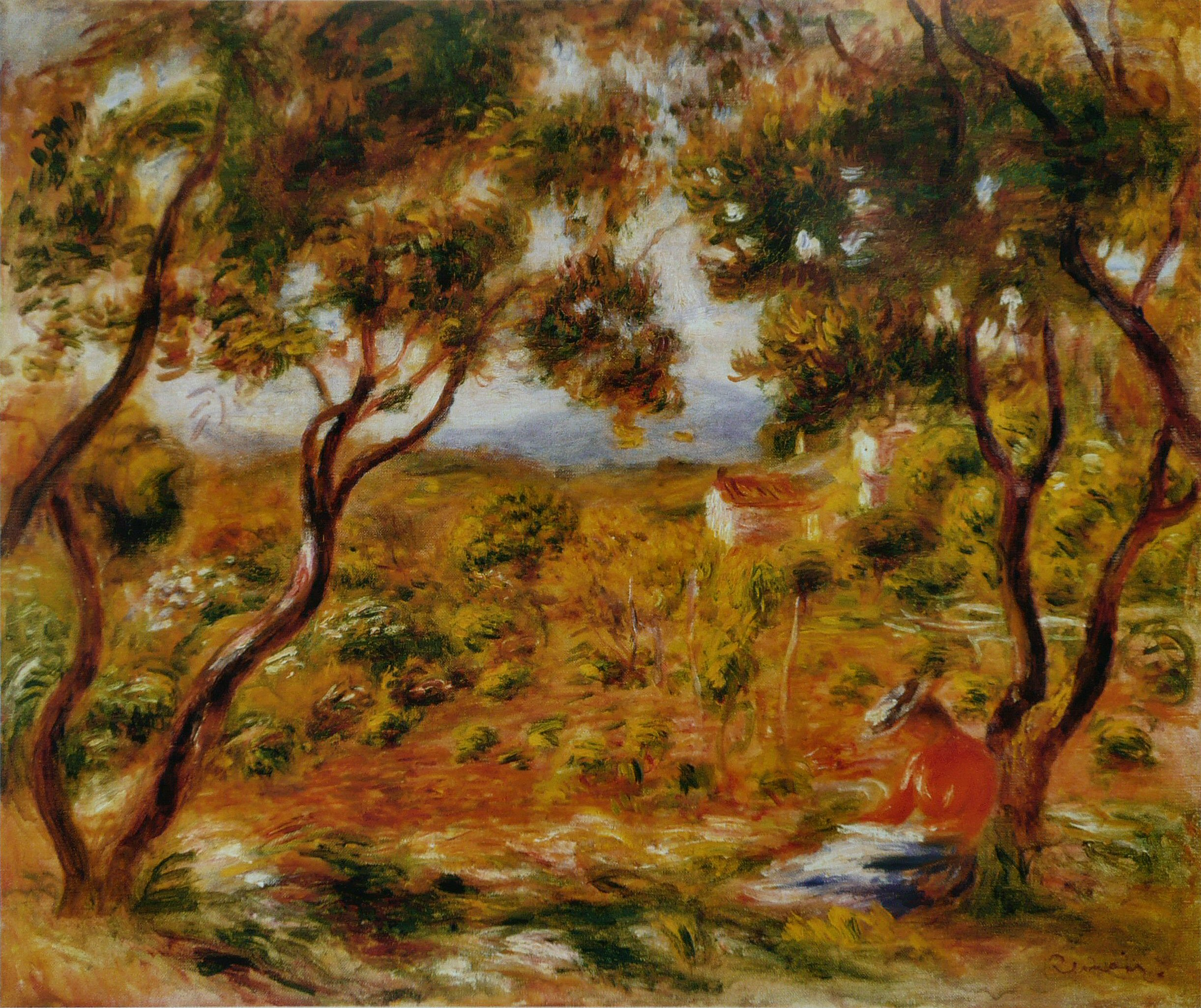
Pierre-Auguste Renoir, Les Vignes à Cagnes, 1908

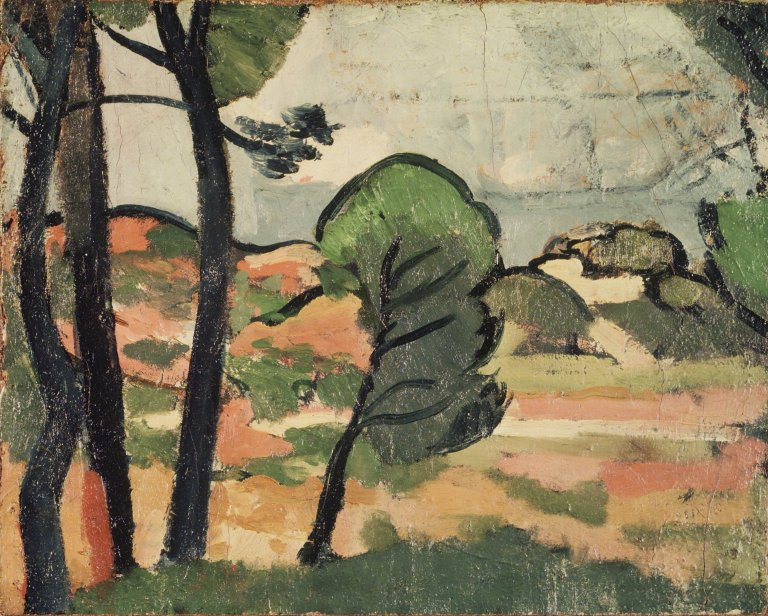
André Derain, Landscape in Provence (Paysage de Provence), c. 1908

=== Other collections ===
The museum's costume collection was created in 1946, and the Textile and Costume Collection was unveiled in 1977. The collection, composed of American and European attire, was described by The New York Times as "one of the best in the world". Removed from public display in 1991, the collection was transferred to the Metropolitan Museum of Art's Costume Institute in 2008.

The Brooklyn Museum has had a photography collection since the 19th century. The museum initially did not seek out photographs for its collection, which was initially composed exclusively of photographers' and collectors' gifts. Since 1993, the collection has been part of the Department of Prints, Drawings, and Photographs.

The museum's Steinberg Family Sculpture Garden has salvaged architectural elements from throughout New York City. The sculpture garden dates from 1966 and includes objects such as the Bayard–Condict Building's capitals and the sculptures at the Manhattan Bridge's Brooklyn entrance.

== Libraries and archives ==
The Brooklyn Museum Libraries and Archives hold approximately 300,000 volumes and over 3,200 feet (980 m) of archives. The collection began in 1823 and is housed in facilities that underwent renovations in 1965, 1984 and 2014.

== Programs ==
The first Saturday of each month, the Brooklyn Museum stays open until 11 pm, and general admission is waived after 5 pm, although some ticketed exhibitions may require an entrance fee. Regular first Saturday activities include educational family-oriented activities such as collection-based art workshops, gallery tours, lectures, live performances dance parties. The museum started hosting First Saturdays in October 1998, and the event had attracted 1.5 million total visitors as of 2023.

As part of the Museum Apprentice Program, the museum hires teenage high schoolers to give tours in the museum's galleries during the summer, assist with the museum's weekend family programs throughout the year, participate in talks with museum curators, serve as a teen advisory board to the museum, and help plan teen events. The museum also runs the Museum Education Fellowship Program, a ten-month position where fellows lead school group visits with a focus on various topics from the collection. School Youth and Family Fellows teach Gallery Studio Programs and School Partnerships while Adult and Public Programs Fellows curate and organize Thursday night as well as First Saturday Programming.

The museum has posted many pieces to a digital collection that allows the public to tag and curate sets of objects online, as well as solicit additional scholarship contributions. The museum's ASK App allows visitors to talk with staff and educators about works in the collection.

== Attendance ==
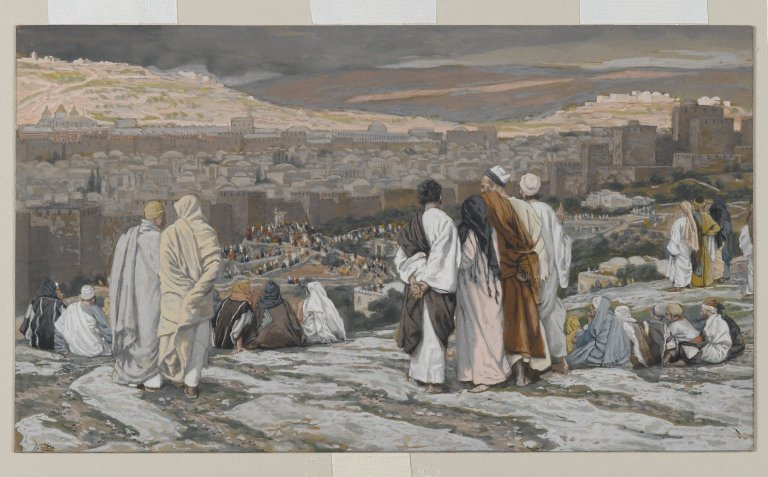
James Tissot, The Disciples Having Left Their Hiding Place Watch from Afar in Agony, c. 1886–1894

Prior to World War II, the museum offered free admission and regularly attracted over a million annual visitors. In 1934, the museum reported 940,000 annual visitors, while its library had 40,000 visitors. Patronage declined along with Brooklyn's economy in the mid-20th century; there were about 470,000 visitors per year by the early 1950s. The museum recorded 1 million visitors in 1971 for the first time in almost four decades. During the mid-1980s, the museum had 300,000 visitors per year, much less than the Museum of Modern Art or the Metropolitan Museum of Art in Manhattan. Annual attendance at the museum, which had stagnated at 250,000 in the mid-1990s, had nearly doubled by 1999 after the museum held several popular exhibits, peaking at 585,000 in 1998. The museum only had 326,000 visitors by 2009, but attendance had increased to 465,000 by 2017.

The New York Times attributed the drop in attendance partially to the policies instituted by then-current director Arnold Lehman, who has chosen to focus the museum's energy on "populism", with exhibits on topics such as "Star Wars movies and hip-hop music" rather than on more classical art topics. Lehman had also brought more controversial exhibits, such as a 1999 show that included Chris Ofili's infamous dung-decorated The Holy Virgin Mary, to the museum. According to one observer:

The quality of their exhibitions has lessened", said Robert Storr, the dean of the Yale University School of Art and a Brooklynite. "'Star Wars' shows the worst kind of populism. I don't think they really understand where they are. The middle of the art world is now in Brooklyn; it's an increasingly sophisticated audience and always was one.

On the other hand, Lehman says that the demographics of museum attendees are showing a new level of diversity. According to The New York Times, "the average age [of museum attendees in a 2008 survey] was 35, a large portion of the visitors (40 percent) came from Brooklyn, and more than 40 percent identified themselves as people of color." Lehman states that the museum's interest is in being welcoming and attractive to all potential museum attendees, rather than simply amassing large numbers of them.

As of 2023, the Brooklyn Museum has a pay what you want policy for general-admission tickets. Half of patrons did not pay any admission in 2017.

== Works and publications ==
- Choi, Connie H.; Hermo, Carmen; Hockley, Rujeko; Morris, Catherine; Weissberg, Stephanie (2017). Morris, Catherine; Hockley, Rujeko (eds.). We Wanted a Revolution: Black Radical Women, 1965–85 / A Sourcebook (Exhibition catalog). Brooklyn, New York: Brooklyn Museum. ISBN 978-0-872-73183-7. OCLC 964698467. – Published on the occasion of an exhibition at the Brooklyn Museum, April 21 – September 17, 2017

== See also ==
- Brooklyn Visual Heritage
- Education in New York City
- List of cases argued by Floyd Abrams
- List of museums and cultural institutions in New York City
- List of New York City Designated Landmarks in Brooklyn
- National Register of Historic Places listings in Brooklyn
