= Brooklyn Institute =

Brooklyn Institute may refer to

- Brooklyn Institute of Arts and Sciences, now the Brooklyn Museum
- Brooklyn Polytechnic Institute, now the Polytechnic Institute of New York University
- Brooklyn Lyceum, also known as Brooklyn Institute, the first building which housed the Brooklyn Institute of Arts and Sciences
