= Brooklyn Apprentices' Library =

Library in Brooklyn, New York

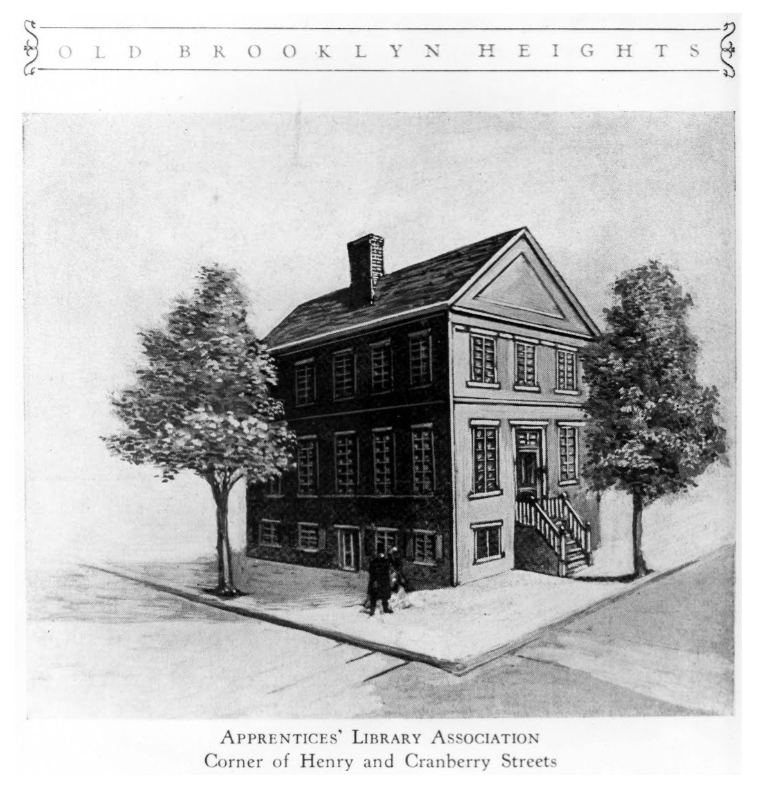
An engraving of the Brooklyn Apprentices' Library in 1825

The Brooklyn Apprentices' Library, also known as the Brooklyn Apprentices' Library Association, was the first public and circulating library established in the city of Brooklyn, New York. Founded in 1823, it was patterned after the Apprentices' Library of Philadelphia. The library aimed to educate Brooklyn youths, tradesmen, and apprentices in their crafts and other scholarly pursuits.

== History ==
The Brooklyn Apprentices' Library Association's first meeting was on August 7, 1823. A group of Brooklyn citizens, including philanthropist Augustus Graham, met at Stevenson's Tavern for the purposes of establishing a library in the city of Brooklyn. The organization was founded with the purpose of aiding youths "in becoming useful and respectable members of society." They adopted a charter and began to collect books, funds, and other resources to achieve that aim.

A building site for the Brooklyn Apprentices' Library was found at the intersection of Cranberry and Henry Streets in Brooklyn Heights, and the cornerstone for the library was placed by General Lafayette on Independence Day 1825. This event was witnessed by a six year old Walt Whitman who six decades later wrote about his memory of seeing Lafayette place the cornerstone. He also recalled that Lafayette picked him up and kissed him on that day, and was generally enthralled by the general's charismatic good-natured demeanor. Whitman would later work as a librarian at the Brooklyn Apprentices' Library.

In 1841 the Brooklyn Apprentices' Library moved from its original location into the Brooklyn Lyceum. In 1843 the Brooklyn Lyceum organization and the Brooklyn Apprentices' Library merged to form the Brooklyn Institute. In 1890 the Brooklyn Institute was reestablished as the Brooklyn Institute of Arts. That organization later founded and fostered numerous cultural institutions in Brooklyn, including the Brooklyn Museum, the Brooklyn Botanic Garden, the Brooklyn Children's Museum, and the Brooklyn Academy of Music among other cultural, scientific, and education programs.

The Brooklyn Museum Libraries and Archives still has library books in their collection that were collected and distributed to citizens during its time as the Brooklyn Apprentices' Library.
