= Brooklyn Museum Libraries and Archives =

- Nicolas Sanson. Atlas nouveau, 1692. Table of contents, detail.

- Location within New York City
- Established: 1823
- Location: 200 Eastern Parkway, Brooklyn, New York, NY
- Coordinates: 40.6712062°N 73.9636306°W
- Type: Library
- Collection size: 300,000 volumes and 3,000+ linear feet archives
- Director: Deirdre Lawrence (Principal Librarian)
- Website: www.brooklynmuseum.org/opencollection/archives/

The Brooklyn Museum Libraries and Archives holds approximately 300,000 volumes and over 3,000 linear feet of archives related to the history of the museum and its collections. The library collections comprise books, periodicals, auction catalogs, artist and institutional files as well as special collections containing photographs, sketches, artists' books, rare books and trade catalogues. The museum archives contains institutional records, curatorial correspondence, expedition reports, and other related textual and visual records dating to the founding of the institution.

== History ==
The Brooklyn Museum evolved from the Brooklyn Apprentices' Library Association, founded in 1823, and the first free and circulating library in Brooklyn. In 1831, the library acquired its first painting, joining a developing book collection. According to the Minutes of the Apprentices' Library from January 31, 1835: "Walter Whitman acting librarian presented a Report this evening, in which it is stated that there are now about 1200 volumes in the library in a proper state for being drawn out; and that the number of Readers is 172."

By the 1840s, the public demand for educational programs resulted in the reorganization of the library with the adoption by the association of a revised charter under the name of the Brooklyn Institute and the library was housed in a new building. Evening classes were offered, the first exhibition of paintings was held and library acquisition funds became available. The library accession records document early institutional interest in the world at large. An early acquisition is currently in the museum's long term installation, Connecting Cultures.

Over the next forty years, the Brooklyn Institute grew and was reorganized into the Brooklyn Institute of Arts & Sciences, which eventually became the parent organization of the Brooklyn Museum, Brooklyn Children's Museum, the Brooklyn Academy of Music (BAM) and the Brooklyn Botanic Garden. During the late 1880s, plans were established to revitalize the institute in order ″to make the property of the Institute the nucleus of a broad and comprehensive institution for the advancement of science and art...″ After an architectural competition held in 1893, the firm of McKim, Mead & White was chosen to design a building to house the Brooklyn Museum and its library.

The early 1900s saw reorganization of the original Apprentices' Library by the museum librarians who kept portions of the collection that supported research on the museum's object collections and transferred the rest to other libraries in Brooklyn and other institutions.

William Henry Goodyear, the museum's first Curator of Fine Arts (1890-1923), founding museum librarian Susan A. Hutchinson (1900–35) and Stewart Culin, the museum's first Curator of Ethnology (1903–29), laid the foundation of the research and object collections. Some of the rarest material in the library collection today, such as a set of documentary photographs of Mexico and Central America taken by Alfred P. Maudslay in the 1880s, was acquired under their direction. After Stewart Culin died, the trustees acquired his archives and personal library of nearly 7,000 titles, focused primarily on the arts and culture of the Americas, Asia, Africa, and Eastern Europe.

== The Libraries ==
Today the Brooklyn Museum has two research libraries—the Art Reference Library and the Wilbour Library of Egyptology—in addition to the museum archives which support research on the museum, its history and collections as well as the broader areas of art and cultural history.

=== Wilbour Library of Egyptology ===
The Wilbour Library is named after Charles Edwin Wilbour, 1833–96, one of America's first Egyptologists. During his travels to Egypt, Wilbour visited temples and tombs and copied inscriptions found on monuments in the field. He built an important resource on Ancient Egypt by collecting books from fellow Egyptologists abroad, as well as from dealers and scholarly publishers, developing his personal library as a resource to educate himself. Wilbour's personal library was enriched with scholarly annotations containing corrections and additions to the published text which are of value today as they offer unique information. In 1916, Wilbour's children offered his antiquities and library collection to the Brooklyn Museum as a memorial to their father. After this initial donation, Wilbour's heirs continued to donate objects to the museum. In 1932, the Charles Edwin Wilbour Fund was set up by Victor Wilbour to support both the library and the Egyptian collection at the museum.

=== Museum Archives ===
In 1985, the Brooklyn Museum established the archives as part of the library. Textual and visual materials are available to support users in understanding the museum's object collections as well as its history and programs. Exchanges between curators and artists, collectors and donors, as well as exhibition files containing information on specific artists or works of art that have been exhibited at the museum, and object documentation tracing how an object was acquired, and more can all be found in the archives.

=== Collection highlights ===
Today the Brooklyn Museum Library collections are encyclopedic in scope and parallel the strength of the museum's collections. In addition to being a research center, the library collections are frequently exhibited at the Brooklyn Museum and elsewhere. Collection highlights include special collections of fashion sketches, documentary photographs, artists’ books, trade catalogs and other rare books.

==== Costume and Fashion Sketch Collection ====
Highlights of the fashion sketch collection include sketches by Elizabeth Hawes, Bonnie Cashin, Walter Plunkett and a full visual record of every design imported or created by Henri Bendel from 1912 to 1950. The museum's website has images of such collections.

===== Henri Bendel Collection =====
In the spring of 1942, the Brooklyn Museum Libraries sent a questionnaire to seventy-five designers requesting biographical information along with sketches of their work. The questionnaire was announced in Women's Wear Daily. Henri Bendel sent a large collection of sketches rendered by design artists employed by the retailer. The artists attended Parisian shows to record the work of more than 170 designers including Cristóbal Balenciaga, Coco Chanel, Christian Dior, Jeanne Lanvin, Paul Poiret, Elsa Schiaparelli, Madeleine Vionnet, and Charles Frederick Worth. In 1944, sketches from the collection were featured in an exhibition at the museum, French Fashion Sketches from the Henri Bendel Collection.

Today, the Henri Bendel Collection represents the largest and one of the first sketch collections received, with more than 11,000 sketches of French couture imported by the company in addition to its own house designs from 1912 through 1950.

==== Artists Books ====
Artists books are a special feature of the library collection with a focus on Brooklyn-based artists; artists who are exhibited by the museum or who have work in the museum’s object collection; artists who create work that relates to the objects or cultures that are represented in the museum’s object collections; artists who are considered to be innovators or masters in the artists books world. Recent donations include artists books from the library of Arnold Smoller and the library of Thea Westreich and Ethan Wagner.

The exhibition entitled Artist Books, held in 2000, featured 50 books ranging from multiples to limited edition to unique works from the library collection. From 2003 to 2006, the museum featured key works from the Wilbour Library of Egyptology in a two part exhibition entitled Egypt Through Other Eyes: Early Travel and Exploration and the Popularization of Ancient Egypt, that examined how Western writers and artists saw and recorded Egypt from early works on hieroglyphs to the discovery of Tutankhamun's tomb in 1922.

=== Digital collections ===
In an effort to provide greater access to the collections, the Brooklyn Museum Libraries have been digitizing parts of its collections. Some digital projects include the Gilded Age Project, the Bendel Fashion sketches, and Brooklyn Visual Heritage. A multi-year collaboration with Pratt Institute's School of Information and Library Science is underway to provide a training ground for librarians and archivists and to make the library and archive collections more accessible via digital means.

== New York Art Resources Consortium ==
In 2006, The Libraries of the Brooklyn Museum, The Frick, and The Museum of Modern Art joined forces to form the New York Art Resources Consortium (NYARC). In addition to other projects, they have collaborated to build an integrated library system, known as Arcade., to provide better access to their respective collections.
