= William Henry Goodyear =

American art historian

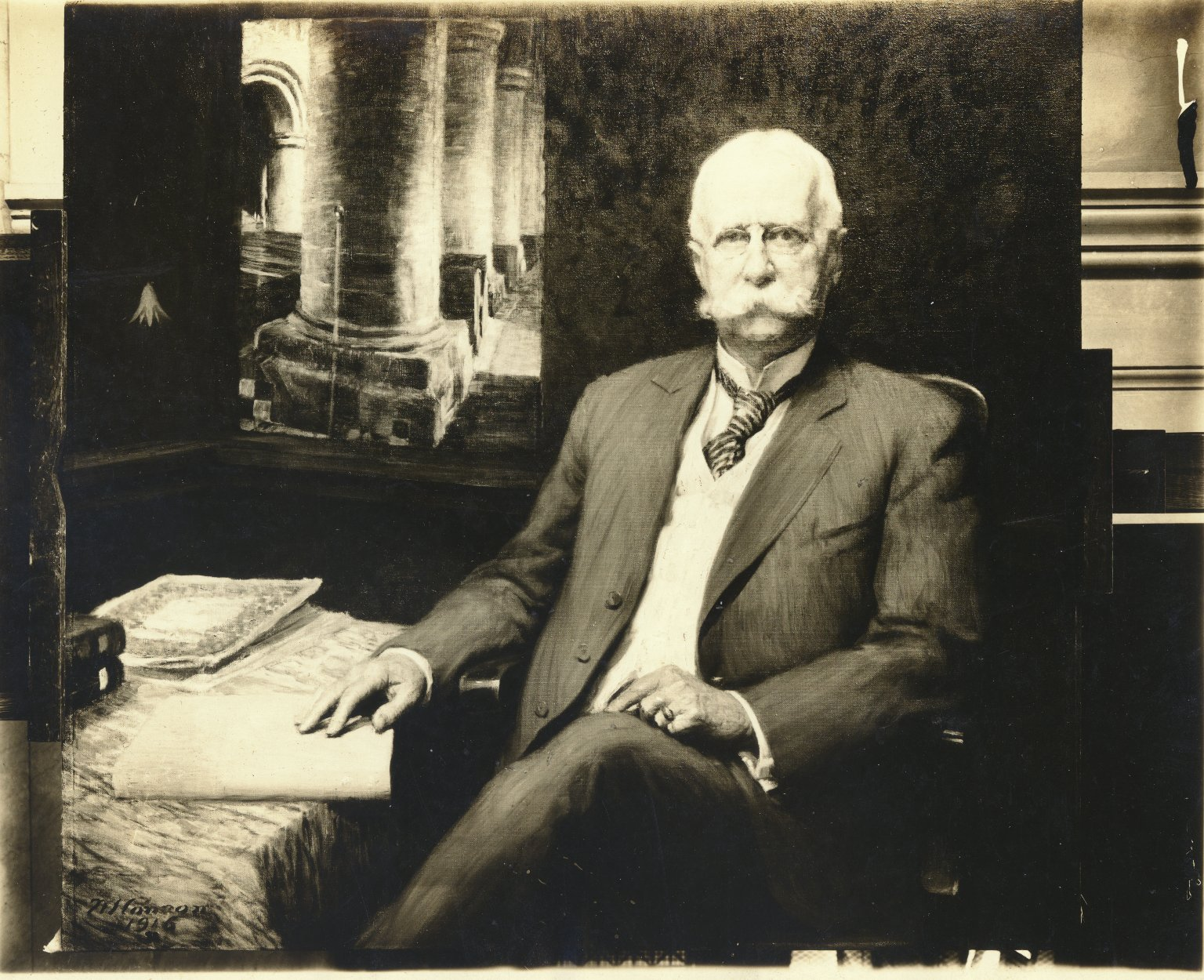
Goodyear in 1916

William Henry Goodyear (1846–1923) was an American architectural historian, art historian, and museum curator. He was the son of Charles Goodyear (1800–1860), inventor of rubber vulcanization, and Clarissa Beecher Goodyear. He was born in New Haven, Connecticut, spent much of his childhood in England and France, and graduated from Yale University in 1867 with a degree in history. He relocated to Italy, then Berlin (where he studied Roman law and history), and subsequently Heidelberg, where he studied art history under archaeologist Karl Friedrichs (1831-1871). In 1869 Goodyear traveled with Friedrichs to Syria and Cyprus, then spent 1870 in Venice and Pisa, where he studied the Leaning Tower of Pisa. In 1871 he married Sarah Sanford, his first of three wives.

He taught at Cooper Union until 1882, when he was hired as first curator of the new Metropolitan Museum of Art. In 1888 he published a popular survey of art history. From 1895-1914 he conducted a series of studies in which he photographed and measured European buildings.

In 1899 Goodyear was appointed curator of art at the Brooklyn Institute of Arts and Sciences (today the Brooklyn Museum), a position he held until 1923. He was a vital force in the early years of the Museum's fine arts department as well as doing extensive research in art history and architectural theory.

Goodyear died in 1923 of pneumonia and was buried in Green-Wood Cemetery in Brooklyn. Wilford S. Conrow, who had painted his portrait in 1916 [BMA, Department of Painting and Sculpture, 25.182], wrote a memorial to his life and work for the Brooklyn Museum Quarterly of July 1923. Conrow emphasizes the importance of the discovery of architectural refinements in Goodyear's life and the value of his work to the fields of architecture and art.

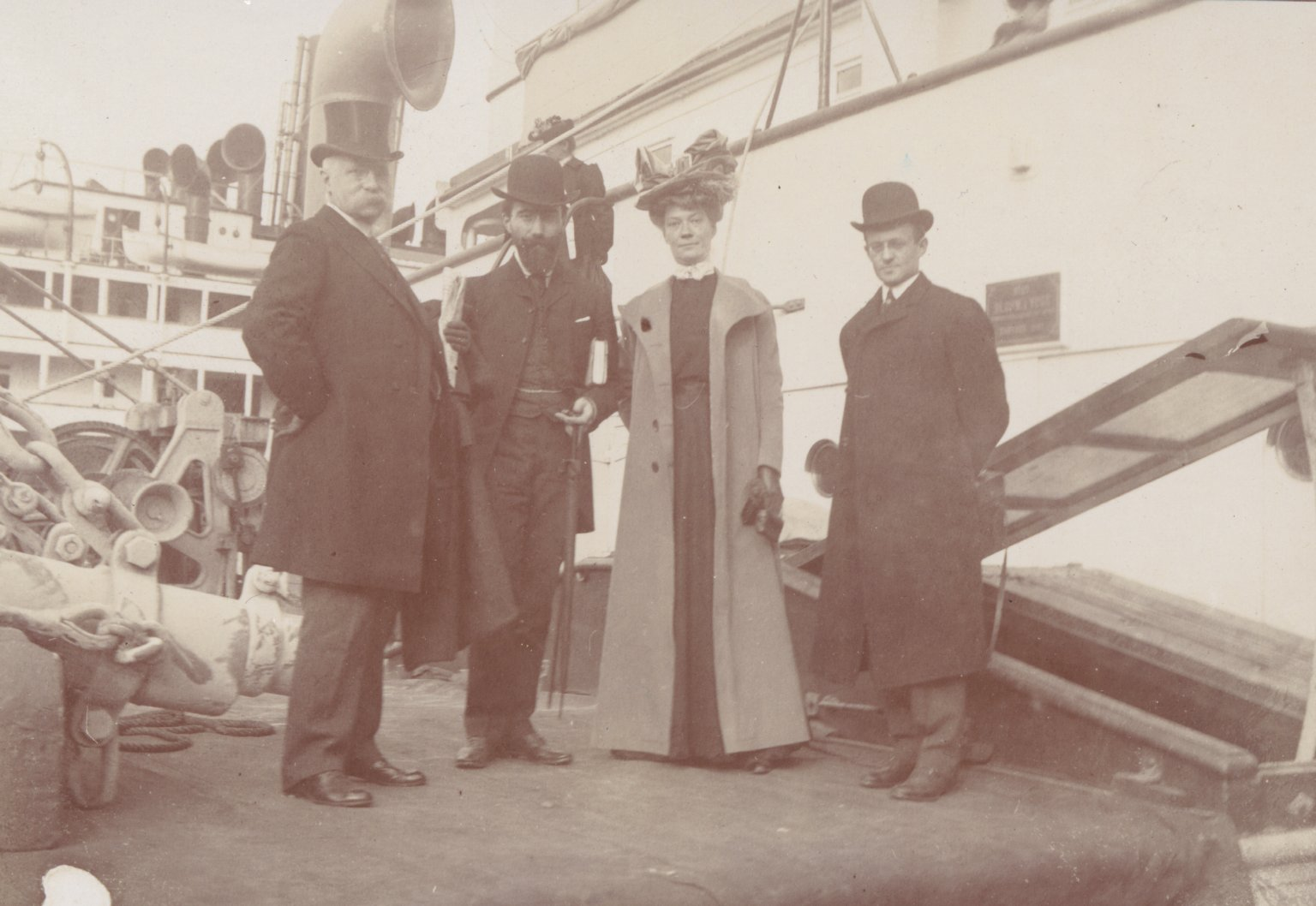
Four people, including Goodyear, in front of a ship. Possibly taken before or after 1901 survey expedition.

== Research ==
Goodyear developed a theory that medieval churches throughout Europe displayed curved lines, concave walls, widening naves and other asymmetries, that were not accidental phenomena created by settling stone or poor construction, but the original architects' deliberate inventions. Goodyear called these deviations "architectural refinements."

Between 1895 and 1914, Goodyear conducted survey expeditions to Europe, Turkey, Egypt and Greece. He visited medieval cathedrals, churches, and mosques, meticulously noting the measurements of features such as piers, transepts and apses, and took numerous photographs of these details in order to document the occurrences of refinements. The photographs are valuable records of medieval churches and cathedrals before the world wars.

On his 1895 research expedition to Italy he was accompanied by photographer John McKecknie and took additional images of objects within Italian museums. In 1900, Goodyear traveled to the Paris Exposition with photographer Joseph Hawkes. They brought back numerous images from the exposition including street life, vistas, pavilions, statues, and other structures and decorative details.

Ultimately, Goodyear hoped to publish his findings and observations on medieval architecture as a scholarly book, a goal that he never met. His results, however, were published from time to time in articles in the American Journal of Archaeology, the Architectural Record; The American Architect, the Architect and Contract Reporter (London), Building News and Engineering Journal (London), The Architectural Review (London), Journal of the Archaeological Institute, Journal of the Royal Institute of British Architects, Reports of the Smithsonian Institution, Revue de L’Art Chretien, and Brooklyn Institute Bulletin; and in a Brooklyn Museum publication series, Memoirs of Art and Archaeology.

== Publications ==
During the time he was traveling and organizing exhibitions, Goodyear published many articles, letters, and reviews in scientific, architectural, and literary journals and newspapers. While he had published full-length works on art history, Goodyear did not publish his first book devoted entirely to refinements until 1912. He described Greek Refinements as a “long-needed addition to the knowledge of Greek temple architecture, considered as a wholly independent study. Up to date there has been no book for general readers on the subject of the Greek refinements.”

== Archives ==
Goodyear was the Brooklyn Museum's first curator of fine arts from 1899–1923. The Goodyear Archival Collection at the museum includes correspondence, scrapbooks, notes, clippings, and expedition diaries, are images of medieval cathedrals, churches, and mosques taken between 1895 and 1914 that he used for his architectural research. It also includes an extensive set of photographs and lantern slides of buildings, monuments, and other views taken during the Paris Exposition of 1900, presenting a visual tour of the exposition.

Additional Goodyear records can be found in other repositories. Of note are the A. Kingsley Porter papers at Harvard University and the John Weir Papers and Charles Sheldon Hastings Papers at Yale University. The National Museum of American History, Smithsonian Institution, holds 199 silver gelatin paper print enlargements of the 1900 Paris Exposition photographs. Five hundred and sixty-four enlargements of architectural refinements photographs (1895–1905), which Goodyear used in exhibitions, were donated by the BIAS to the National Museum of American History in 1901 and then transferred to the Cooper-Hewitt National Design Museum, Smithsonian Institution, in 1974.

The majority of Goodyear's publications are held by the Brooklyn Museum Libraries.

== Gallery ==
Paris Exposition 1900

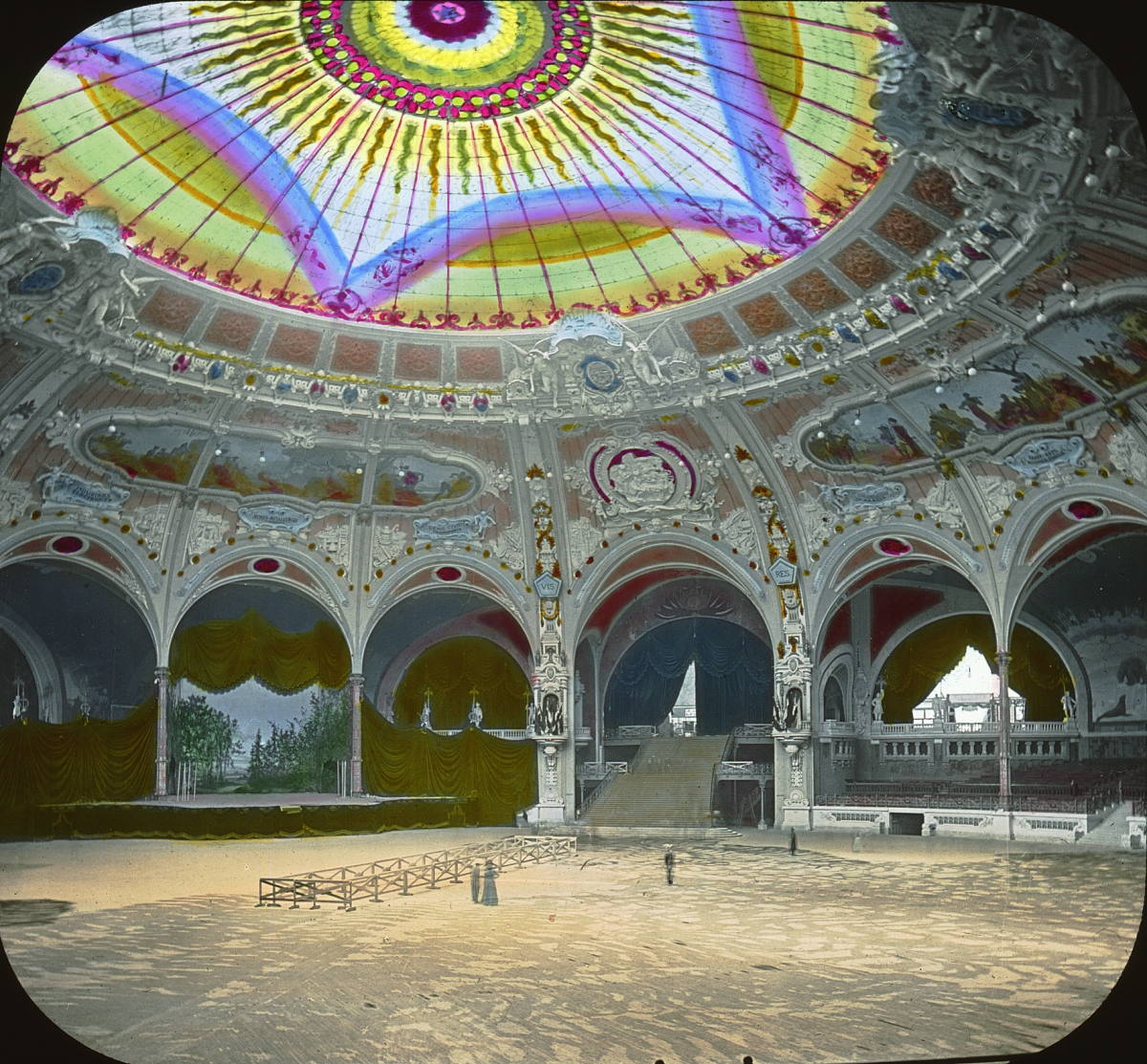
Paris Exposition Salle des Fetes, Paris, France, 1900. Brooklyn Museum

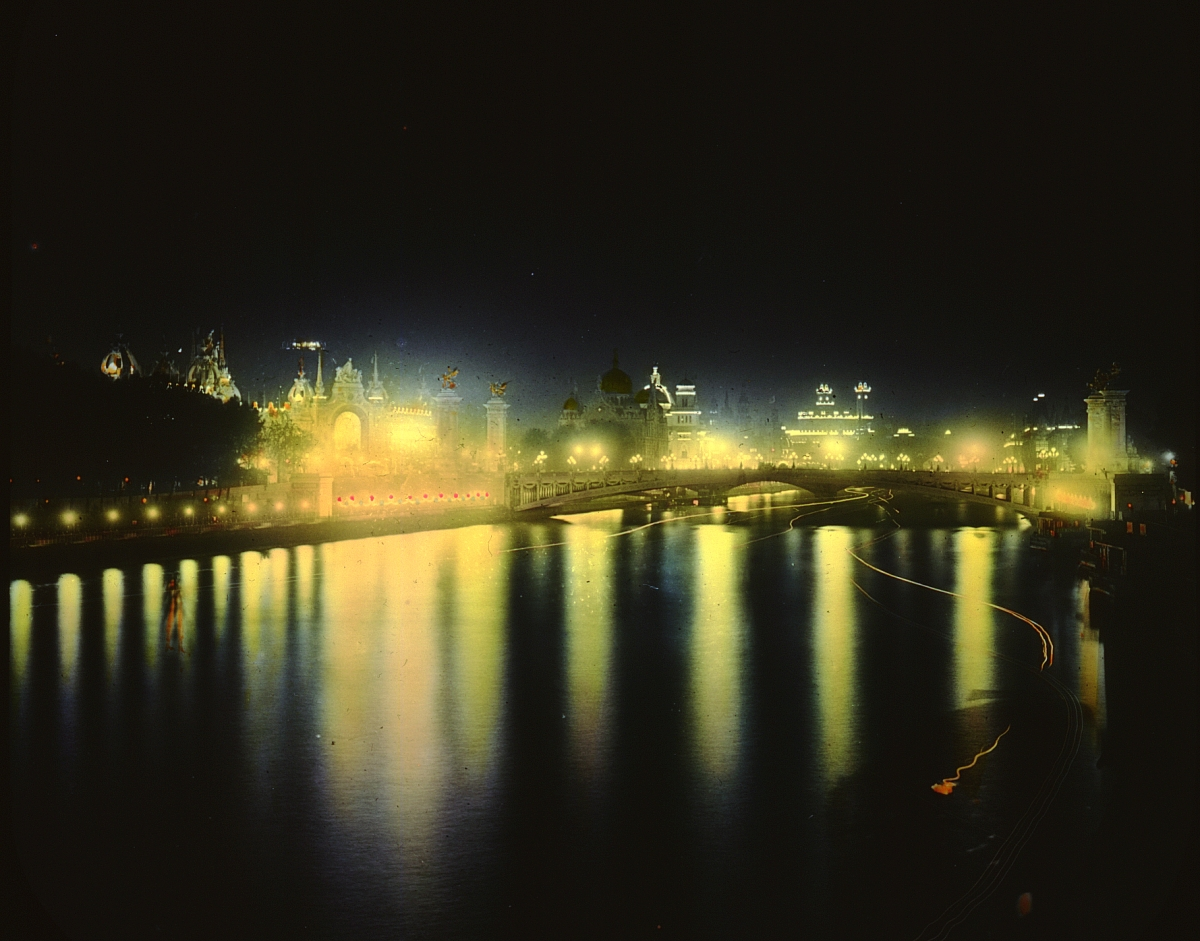
Paris Exposition - night view, Paris, France, 1900. Brooklyn Museum

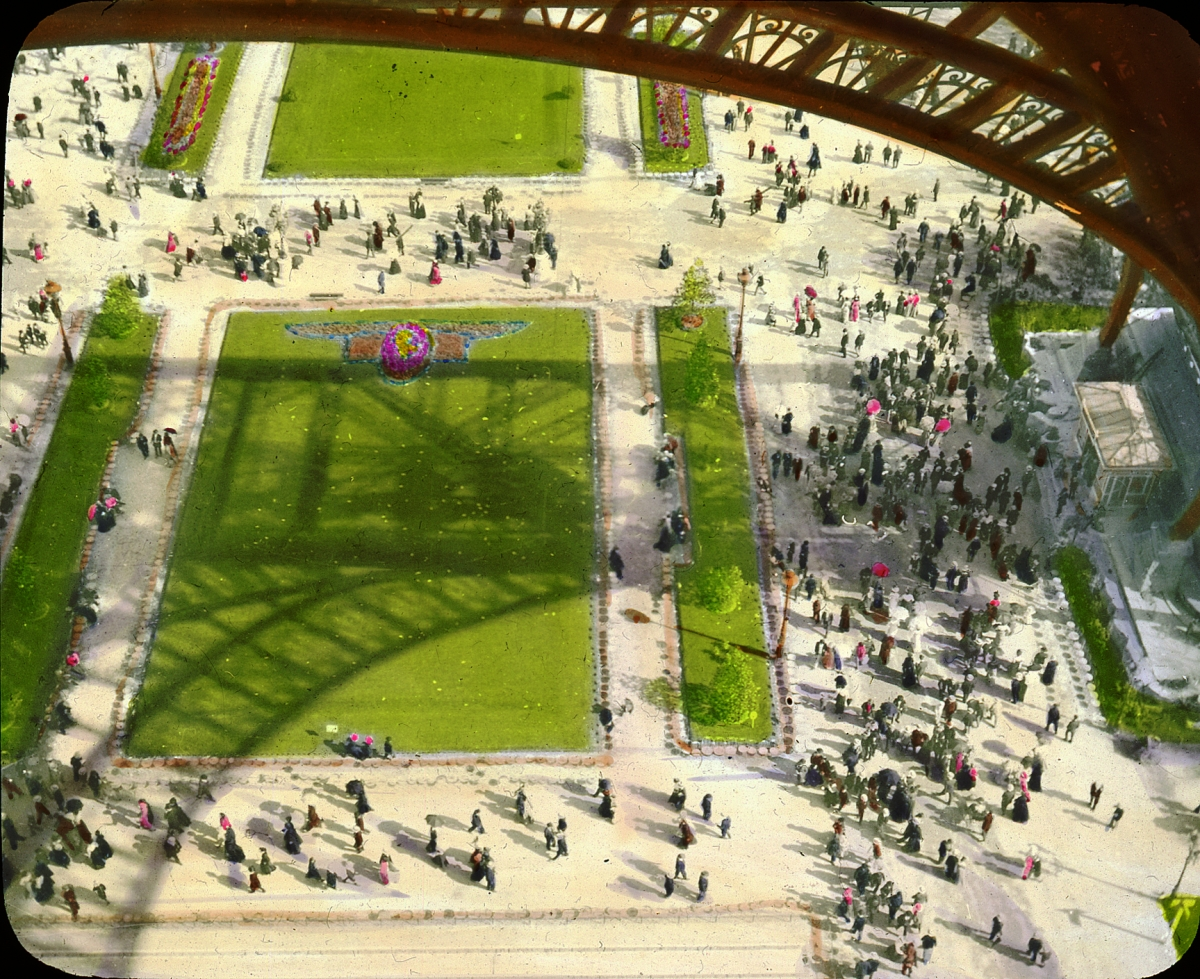
Paris Exposition gardens, Paris, France, 1900. Brooklyn Museum

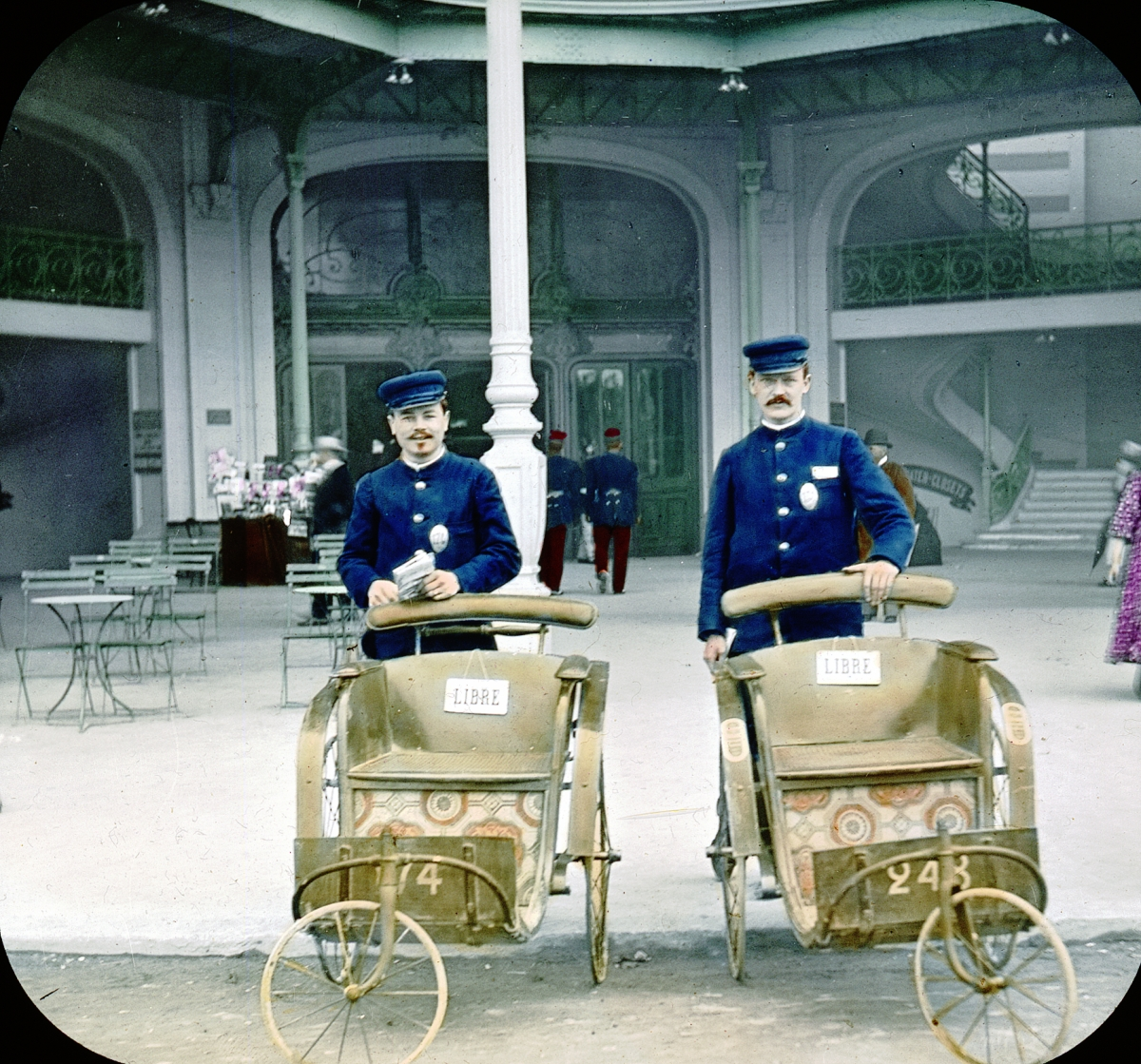
Paris Exposition Chemistry and Machinery, Paris, France, 1900. Brooklyn Museum

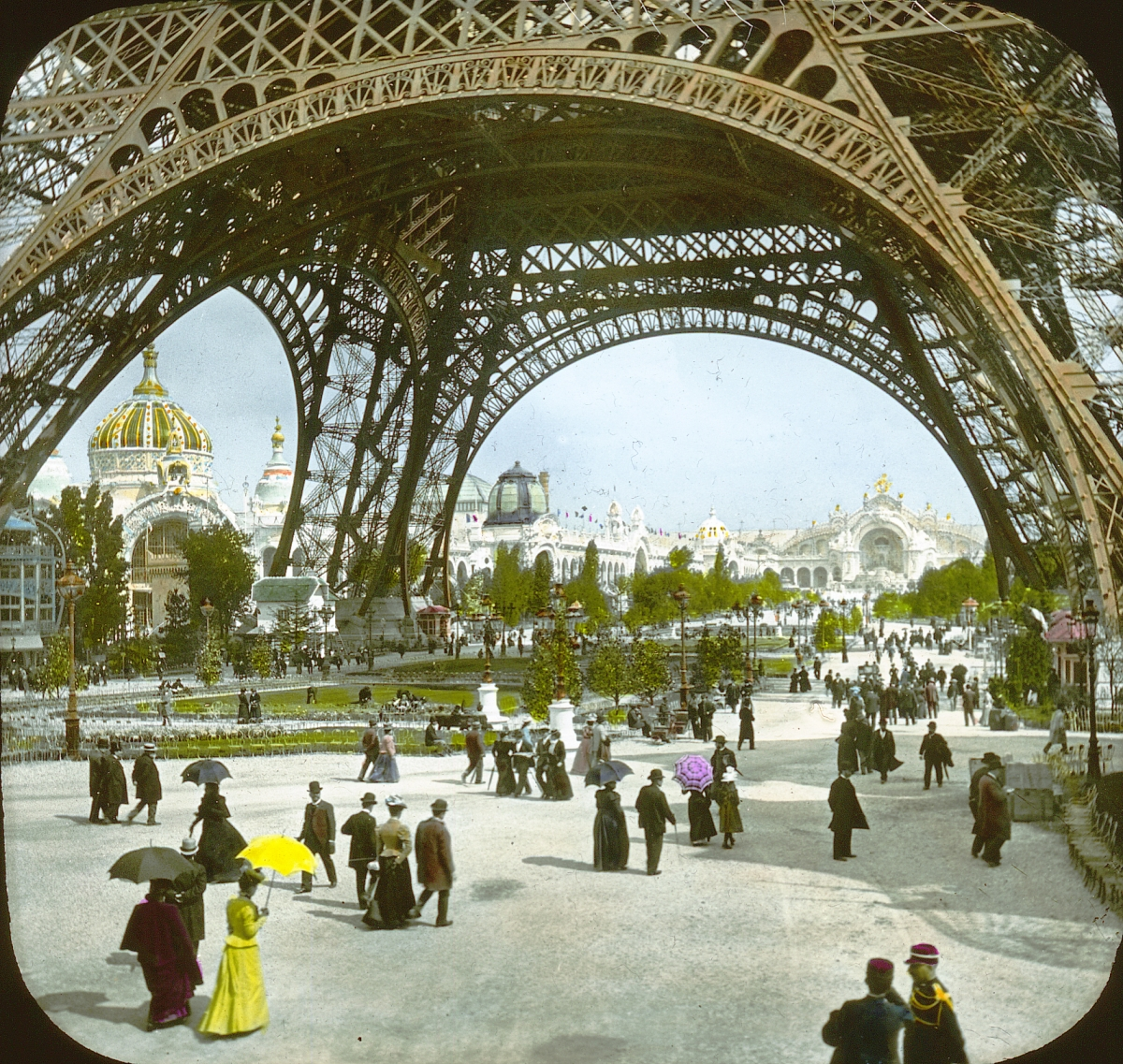
Paris Exposition Champ de Mars and Eiffel Tower, Paris, France, 1900. Brooklyn Museum

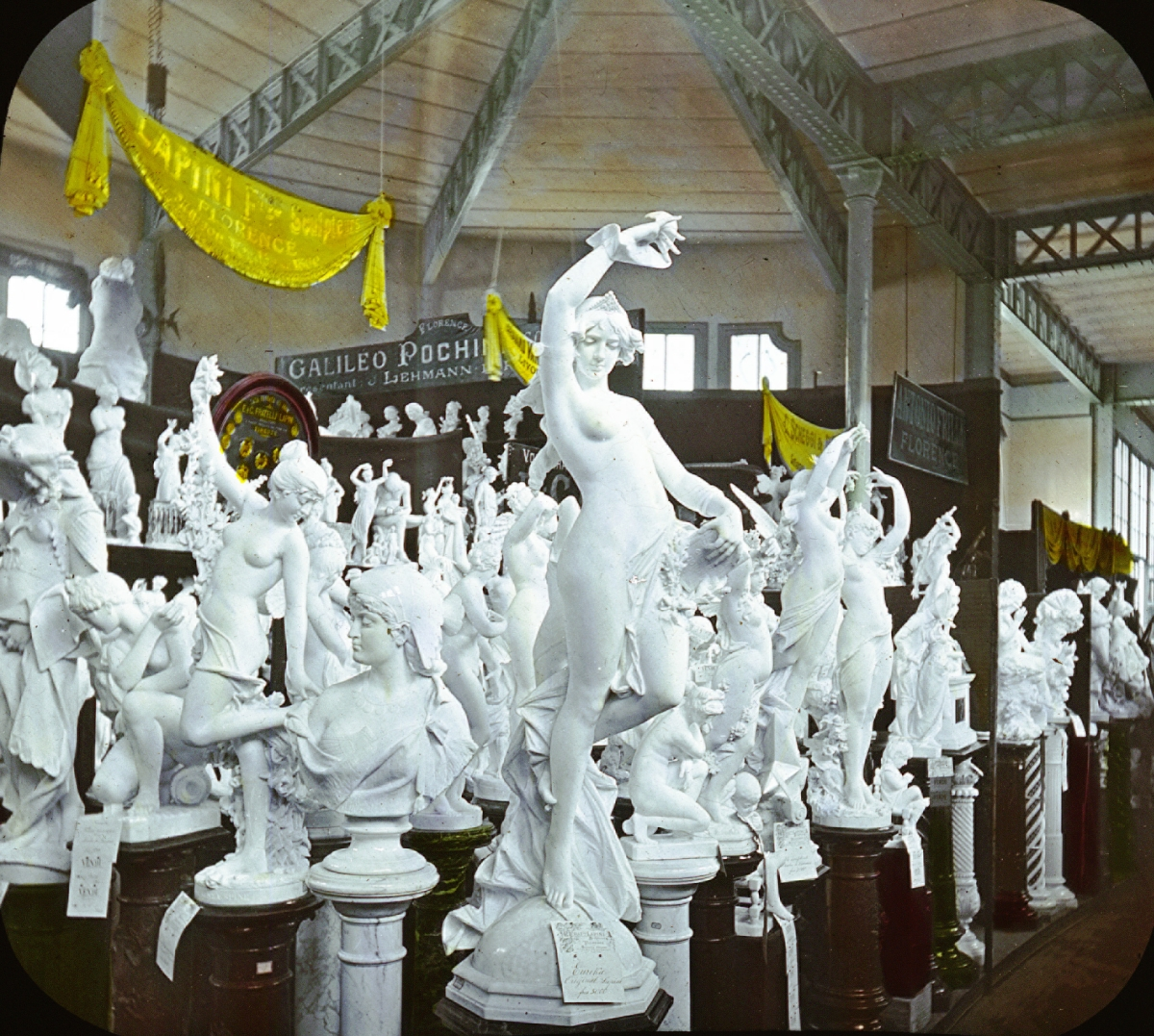
Paris Exposition, Palace of National Manufactures, Paris, France, 1900. Brooklyn Museum

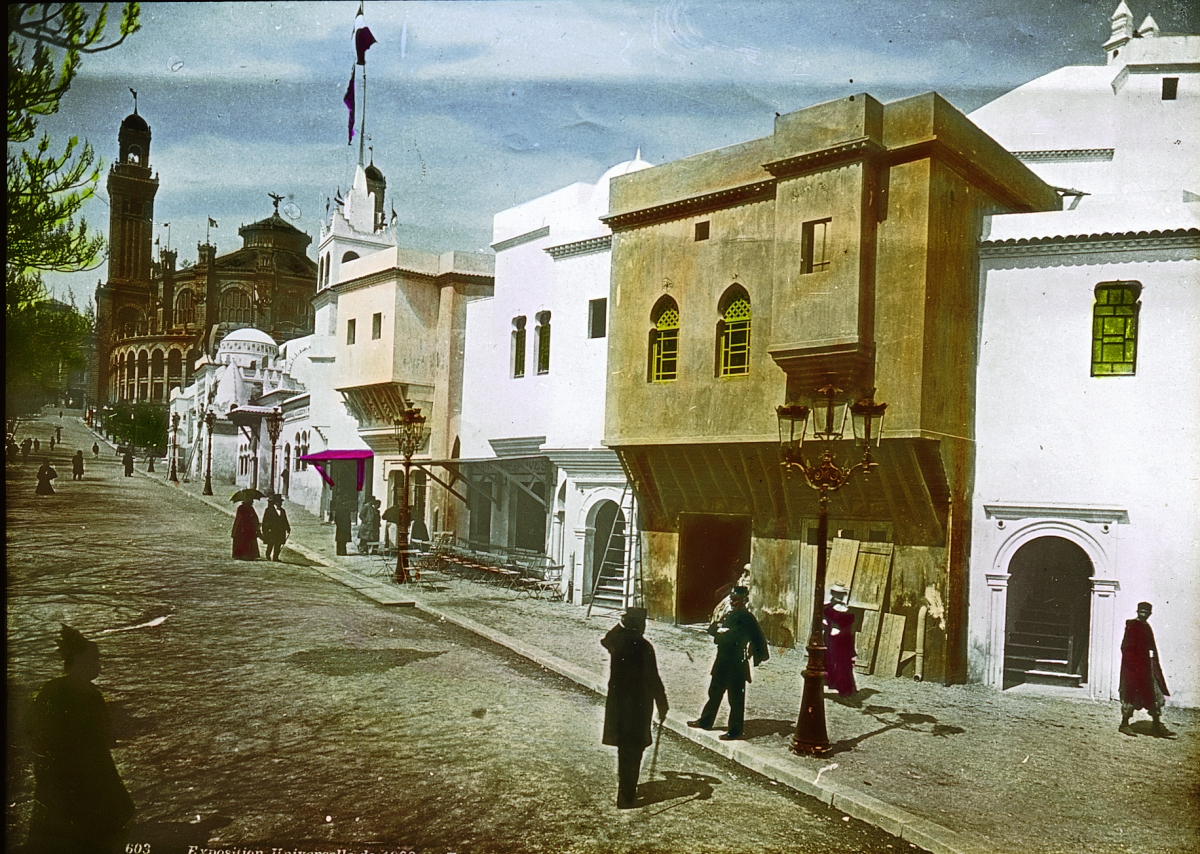
Algerian Pavilion, Paris, France, 1900. Brooklyn Museum

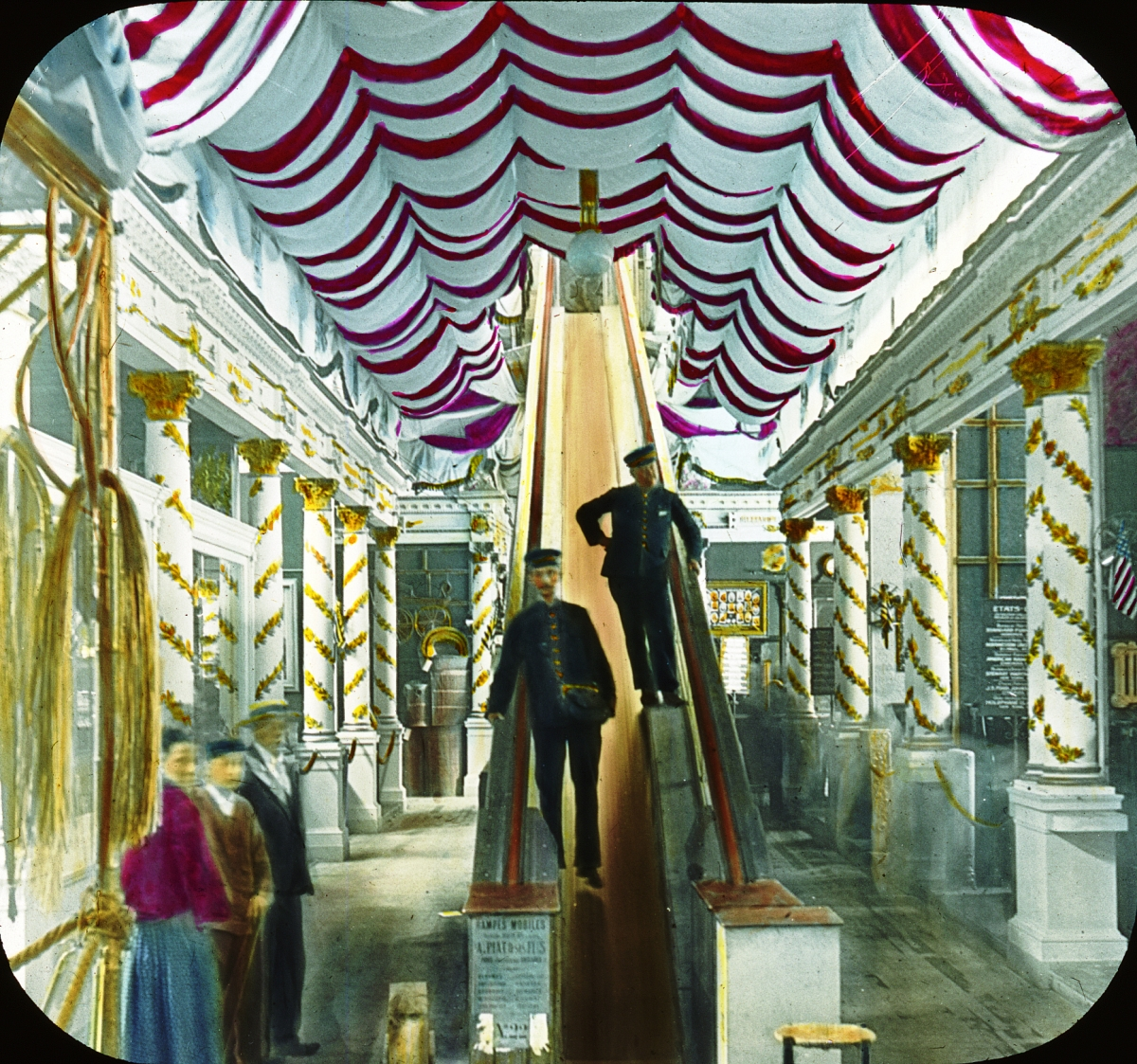
Commercial Navigation Building, United States Section, Paris, France, 1900. Brooklyn Museum

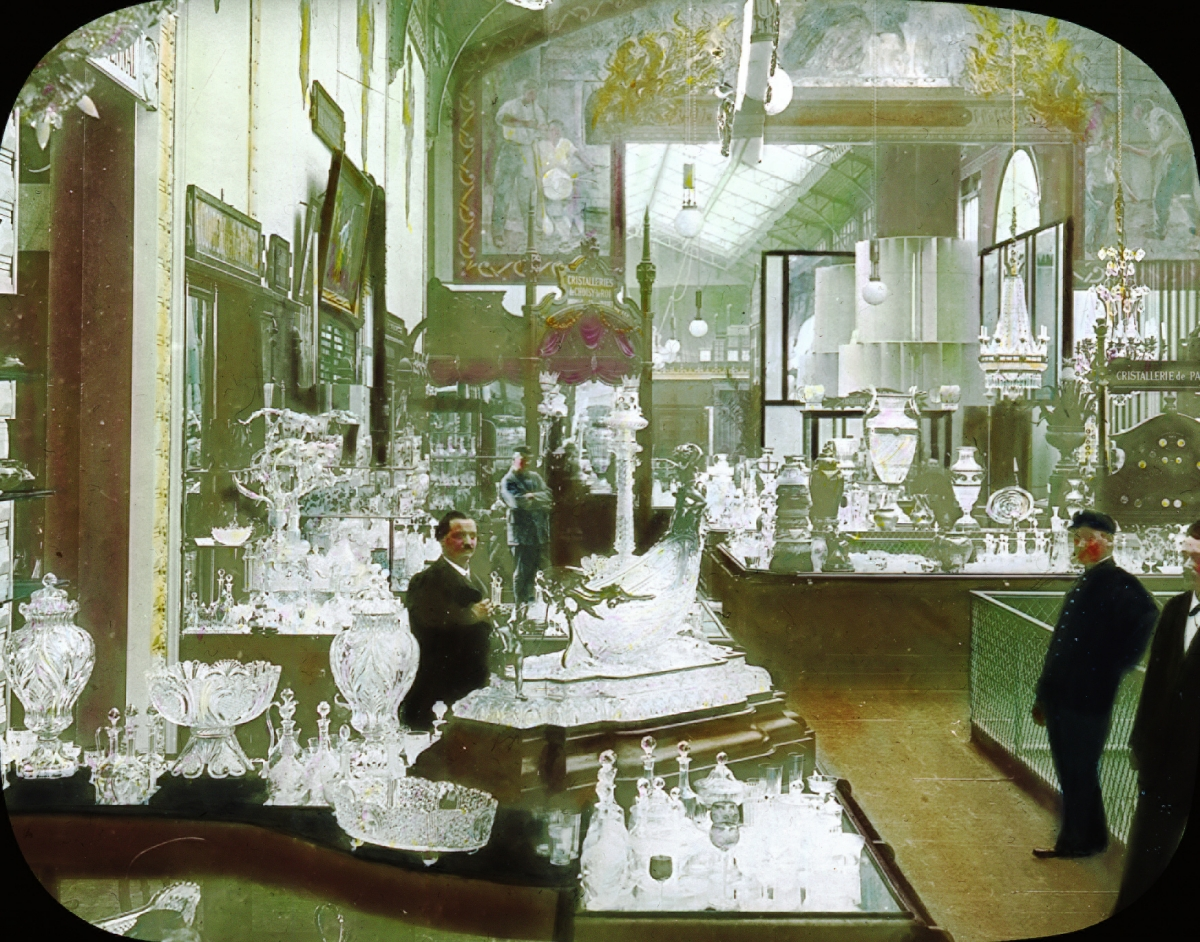
Paris Exposition: interior view, Paris, France, 1900. Brooklyn Museum

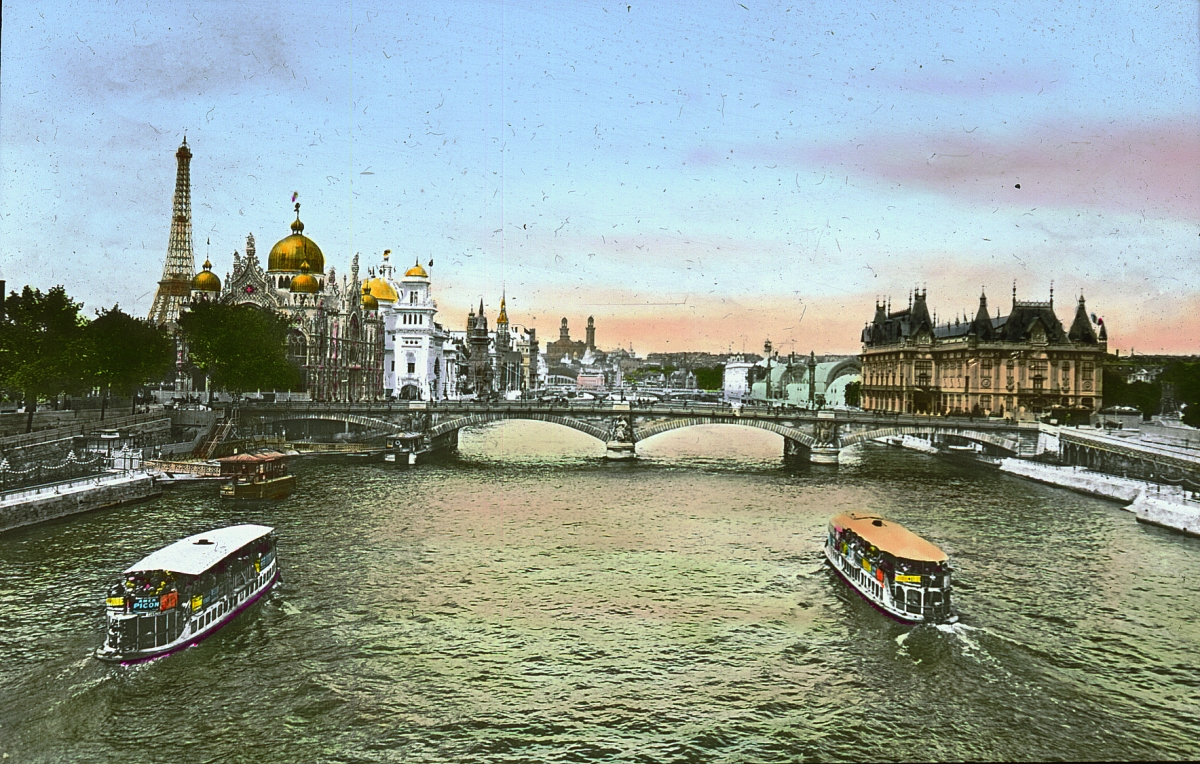
Seine River, Paris, France, 1900. Brooklyn Museum

Survey Expedition

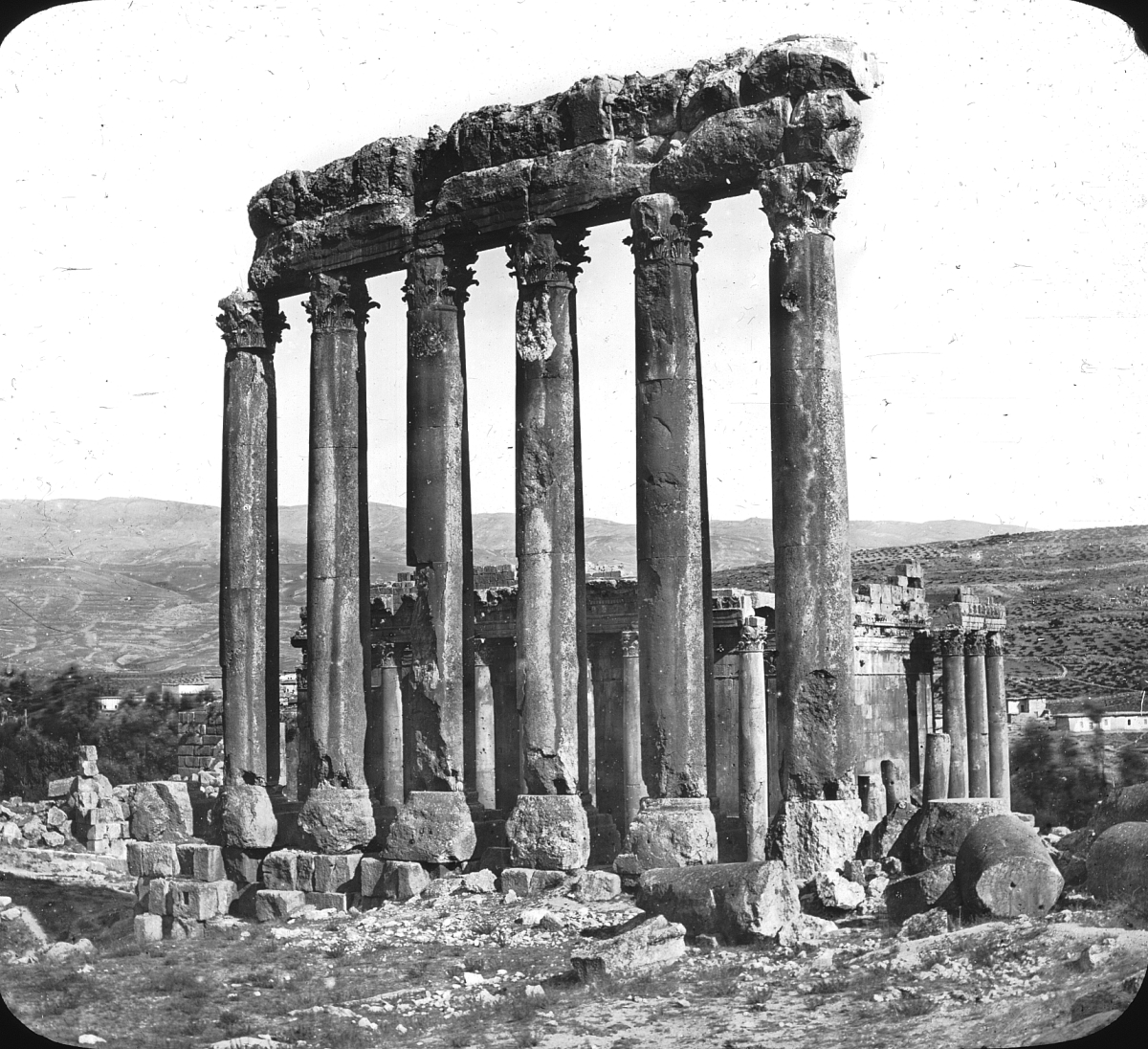
Great Temple, Baalbek, Syria [Lebanon]. 1900s Brooklyn Museum

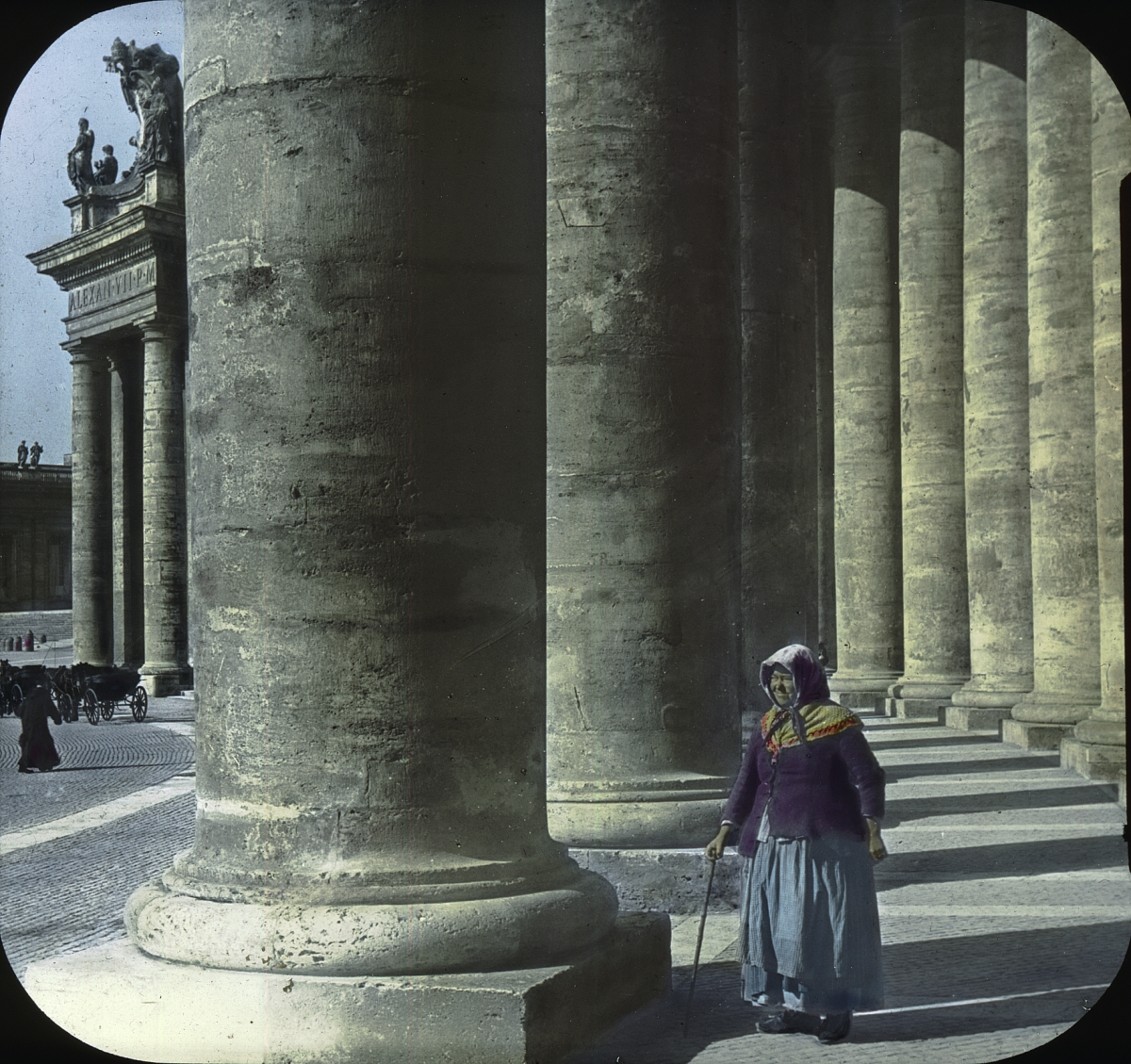
St. Peter's, Rome, Italy. 1900s Brooklyn Museum

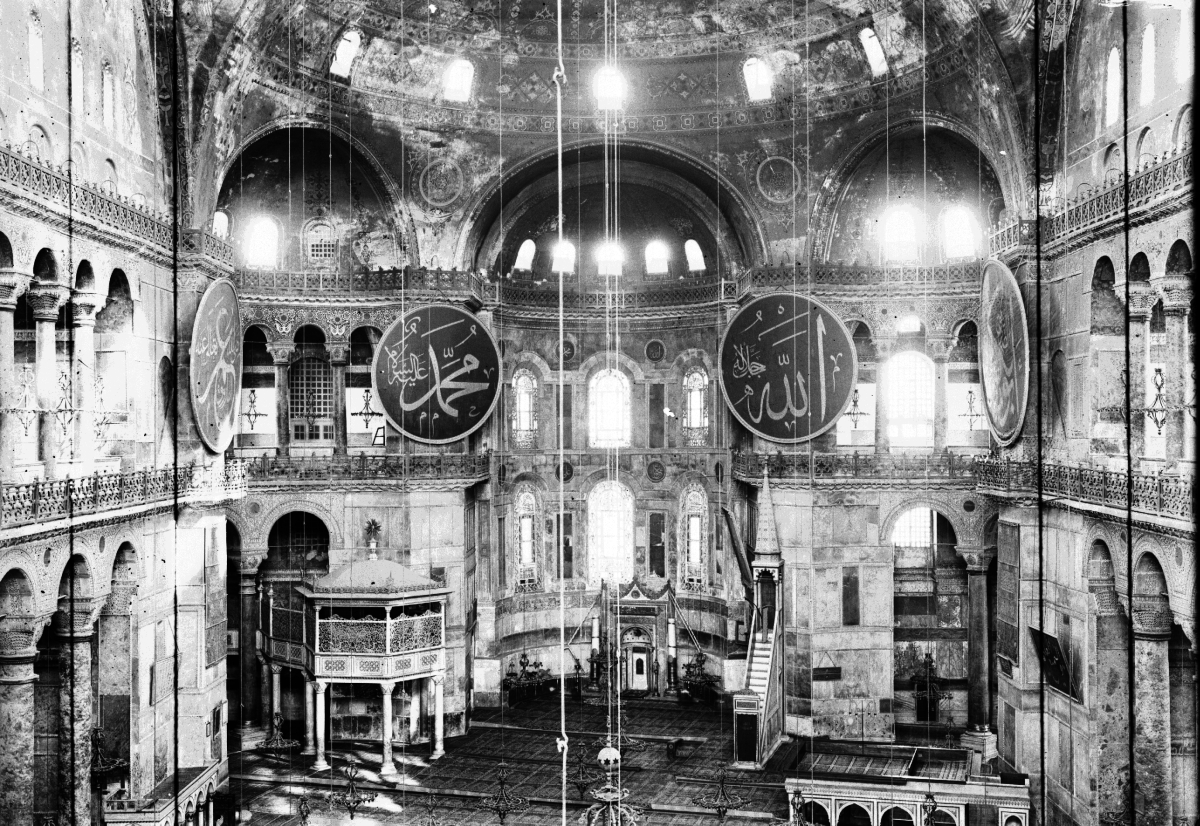
St. Sophia, Istanbul, Turkey, 1914. Brooklyn Museum

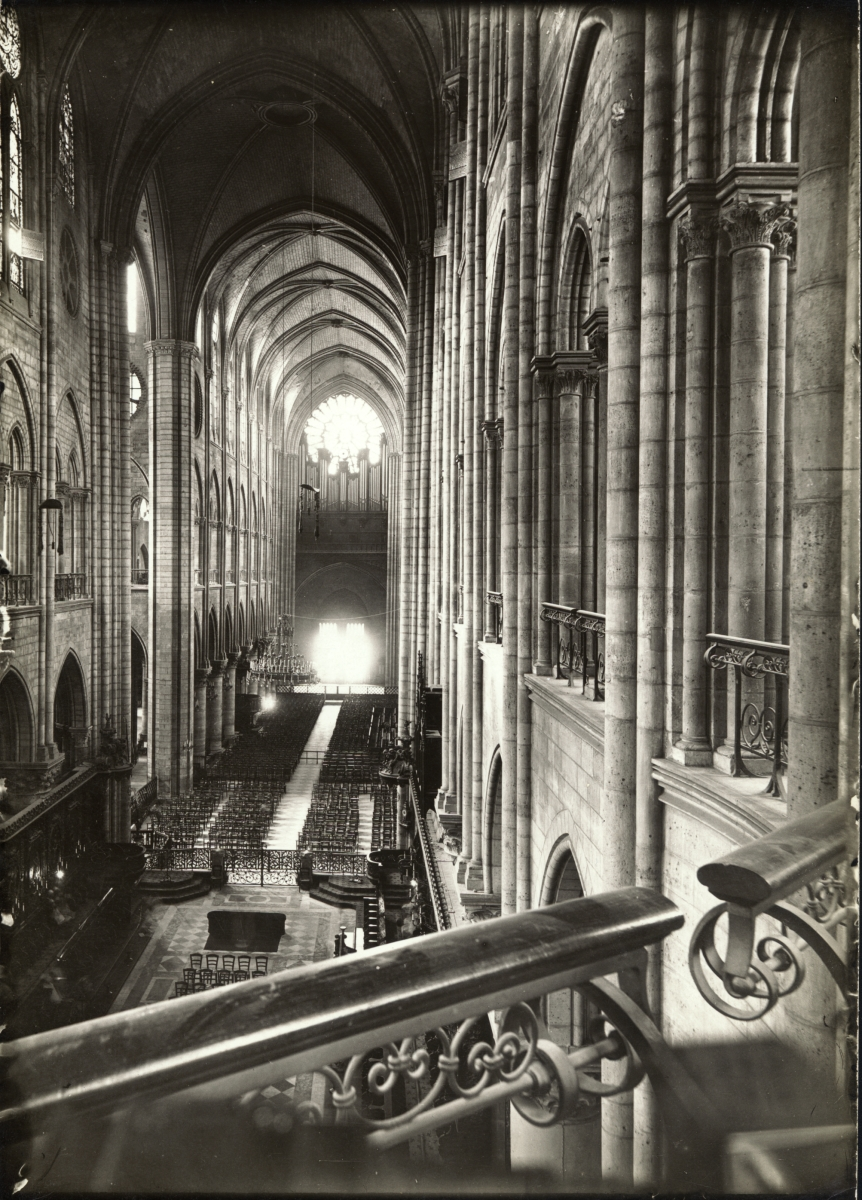
Notre Dame, Paris, France, 1903. Brooklyn Museum

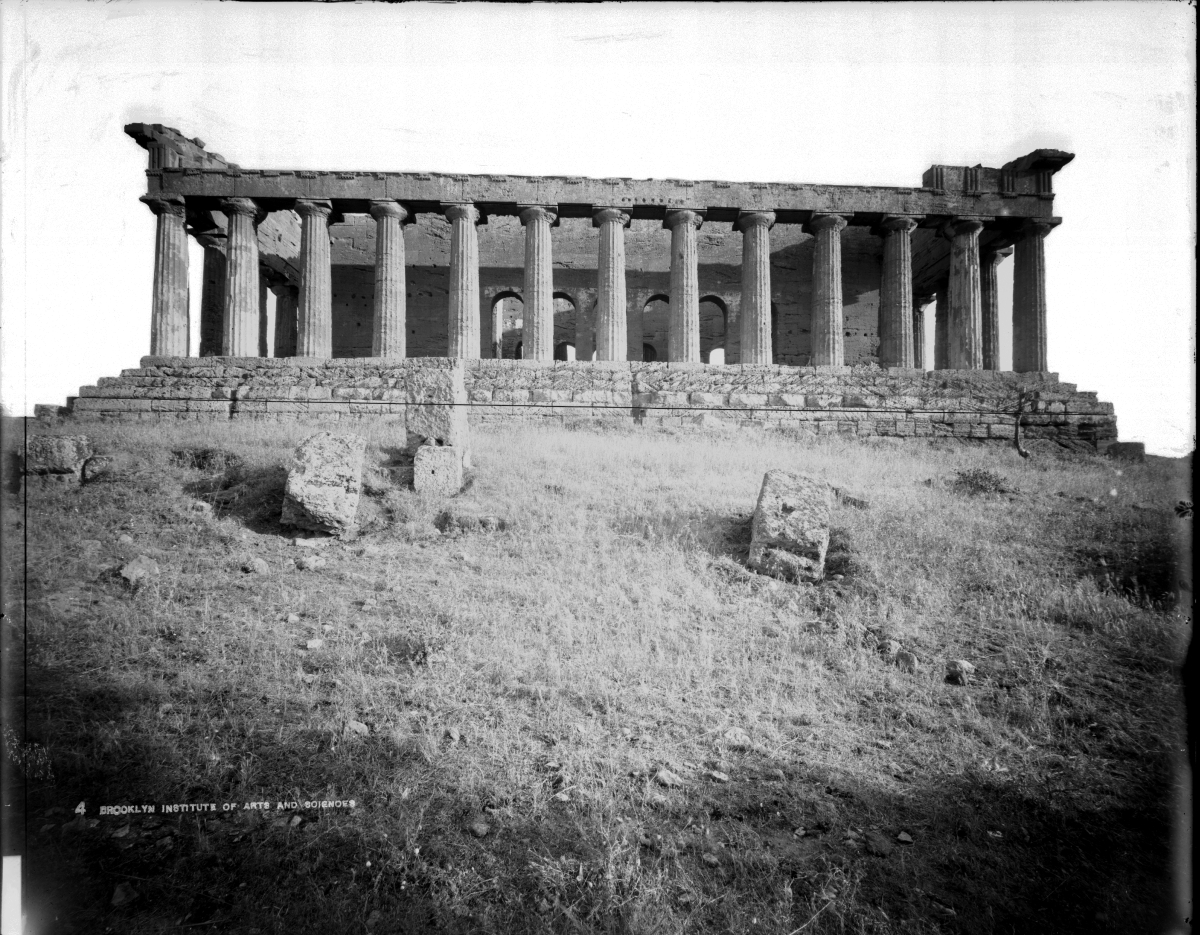
Temple of Concord, Girgenti, Italy, 1895. Brooklyn Museum

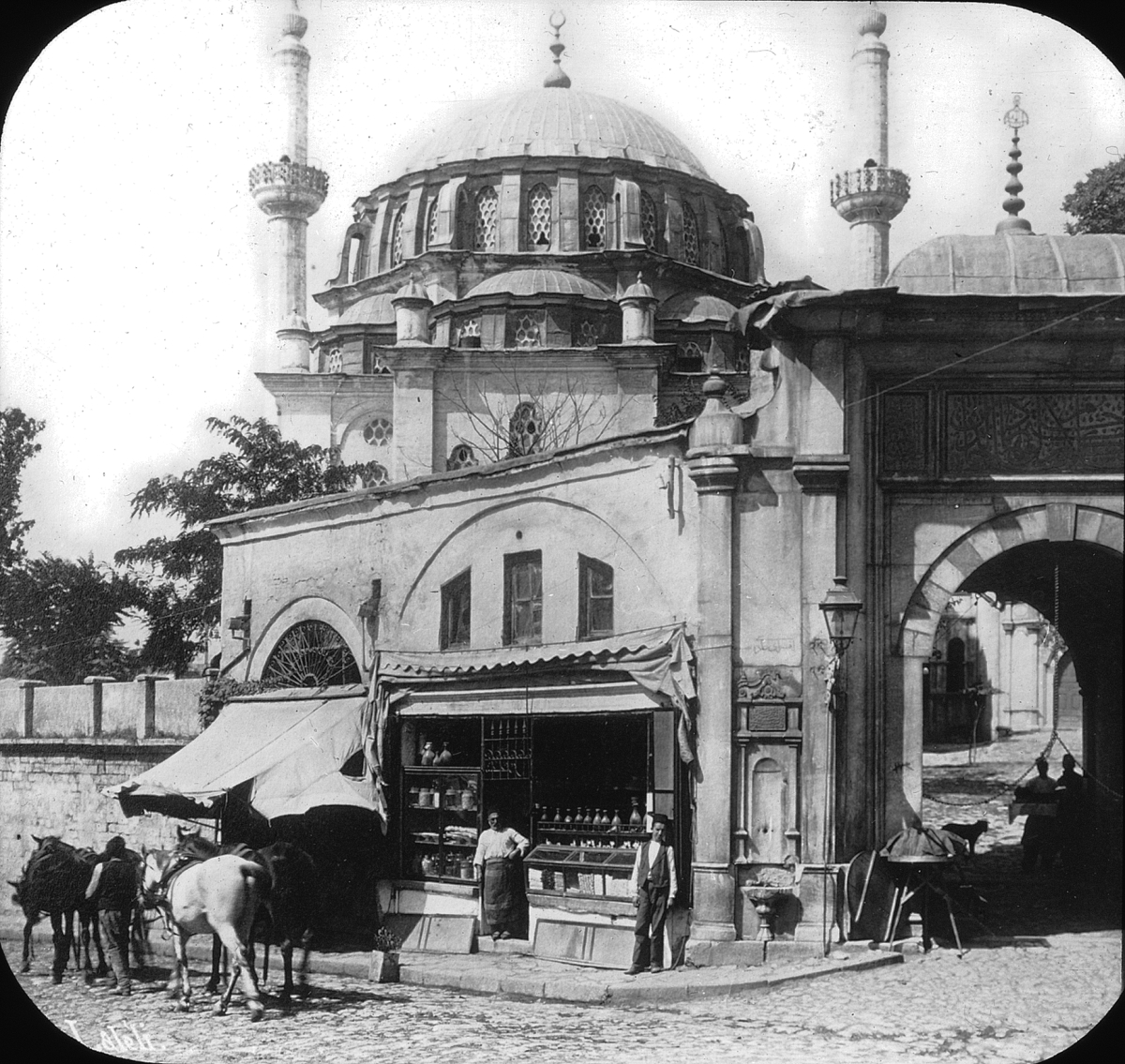
Tulip Mosque, Istanbul, Turkey, 1903. Brooklyn Museum

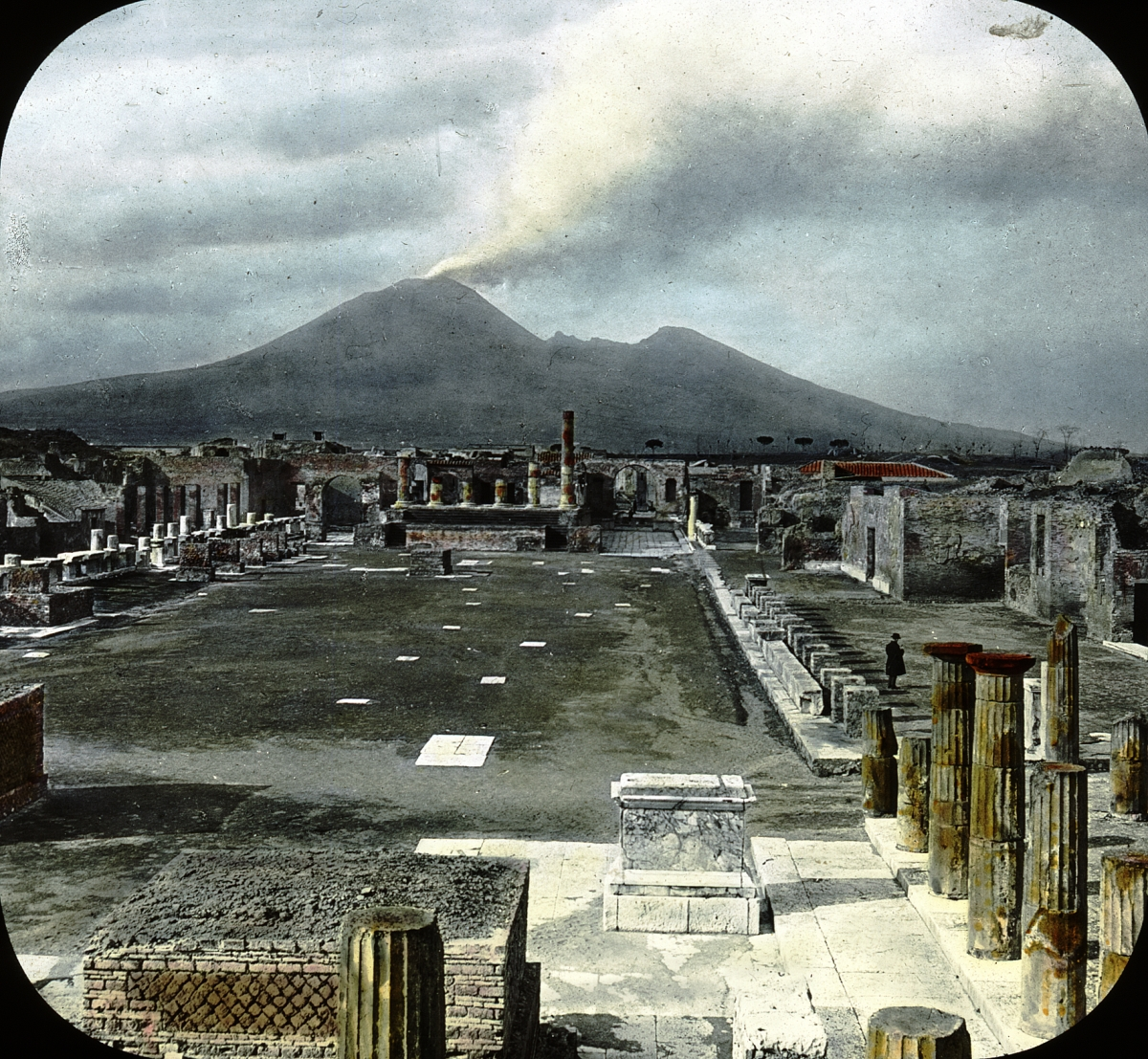
Forum, Pompeii, Italy, 1900s. Brooklyn Museum

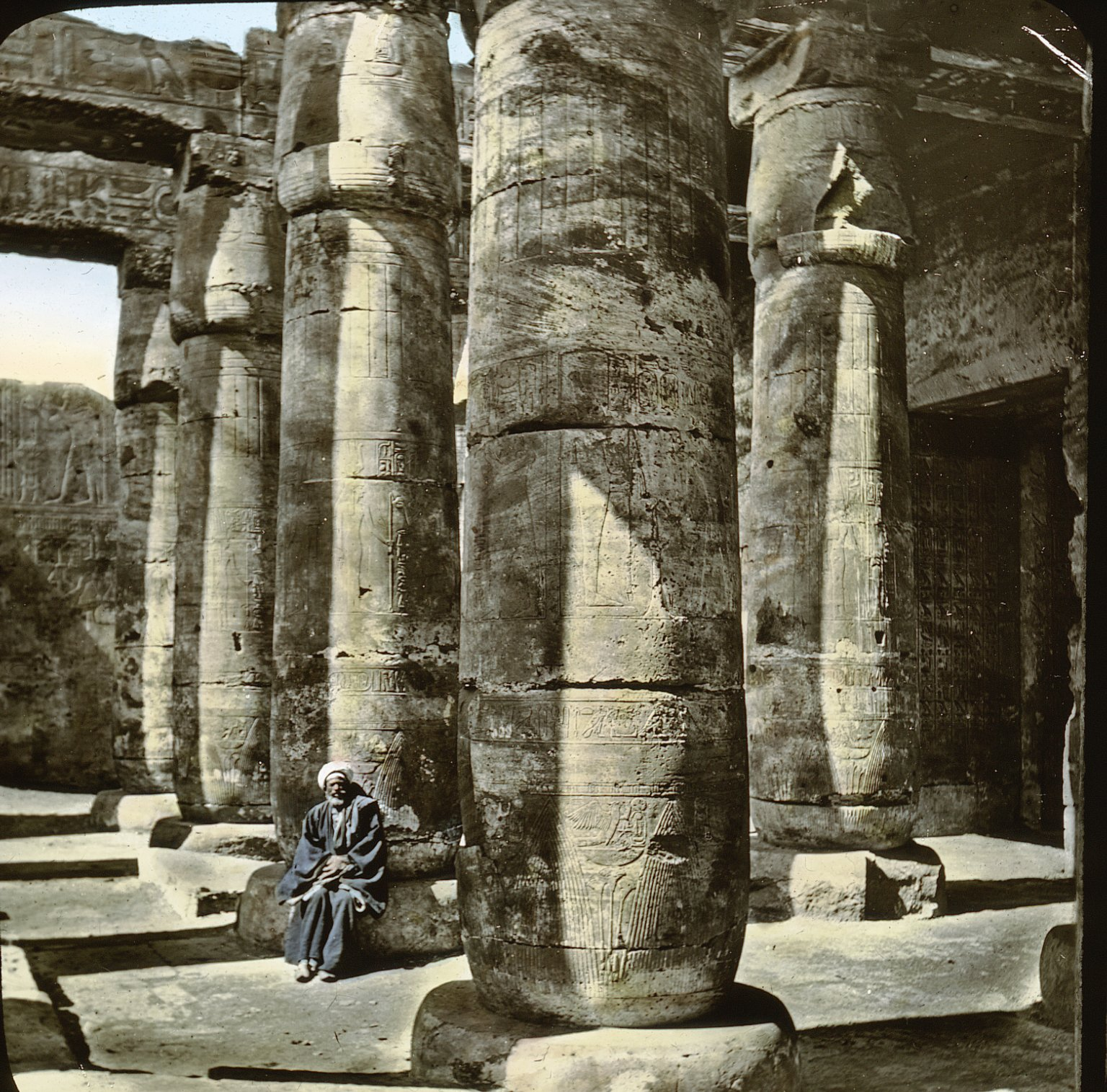
Abydos, Egypt, 1900s. Brooklyn Museum

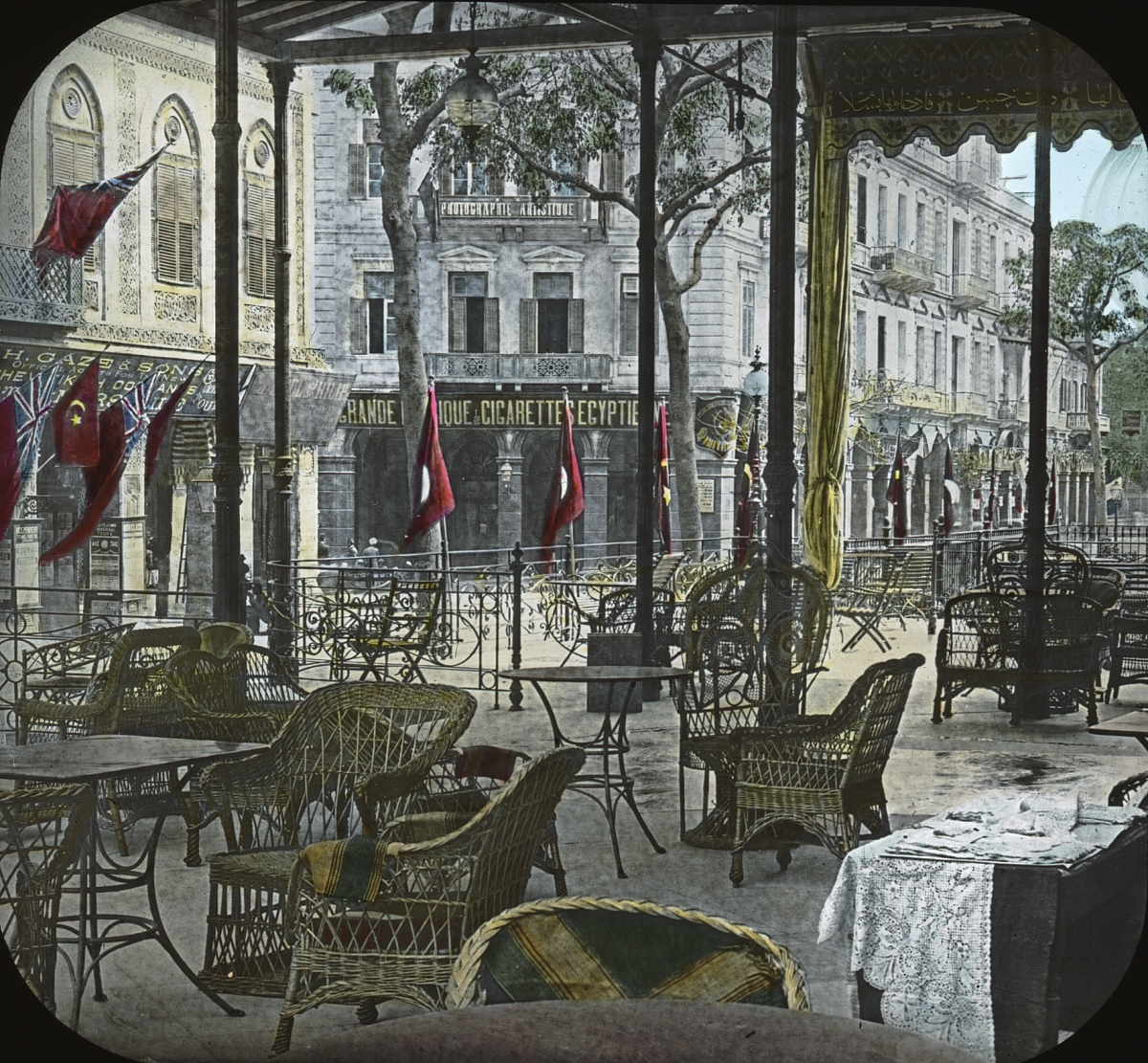
Shepheard's Hotel, Cairo, Egypt, 1900s. Brooklyn Museum

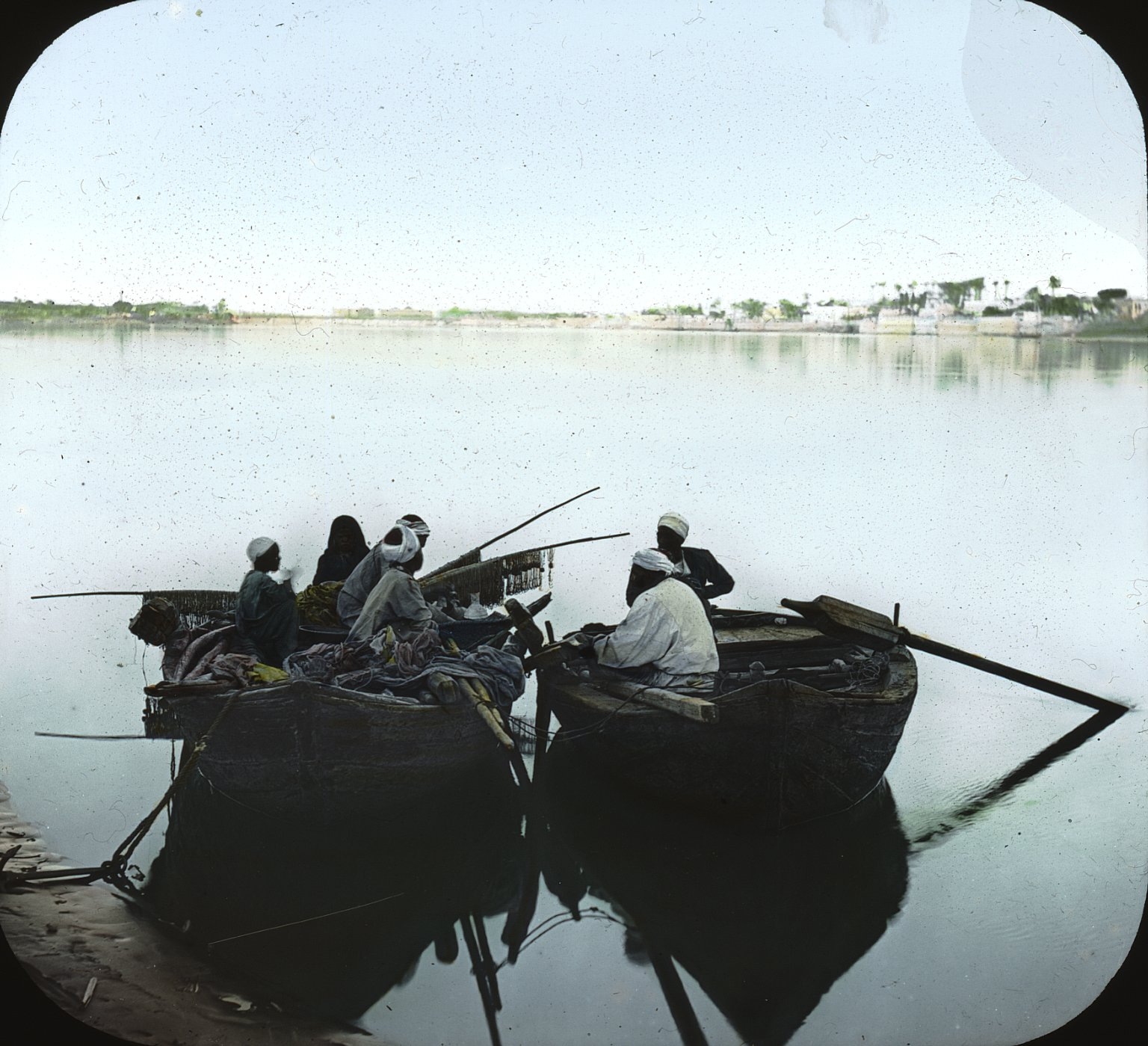
Nile, Cairo, Egypt,1900s. Brooklyn Museum

== Selected works ==
- Memoranda for Lectures on the History and Development of Art, 1872.
- A History of Art, New York: A. S. Barnes, 1888.
- The Grammar of the Lotus: a New History of Classic Ornament as a Development of Sun Worship, London: Sampson Low, Marston, 1891.
- Renaissance and Modern Art, New York: Macmillan, 1900.
- Illustrated Catalogue of Photographs & Surveys of Architectural Refinements in Medieval Buildings lent by the Brooklyn Museum of Arts and Sciences, Edinburgh: Morrison and Gibb, 1905.
- Greek Refinements: Studies in Temperamental Architecture, New Haven: The Yale University Press, 1912.
