= Brooklyn Lyceum =

Coordinates: 40°41′52″N 73°59′25″W

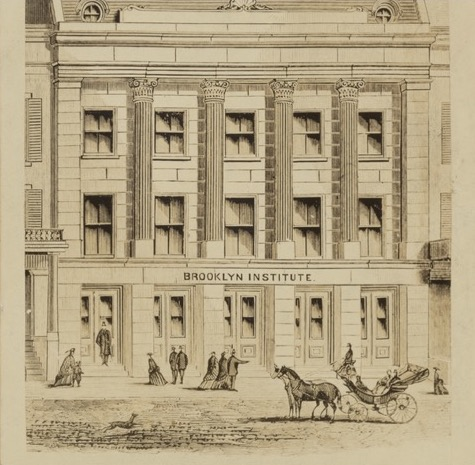
c. 1843 drawing of the Brooklyn Institute, formerly known as the Brooklyn Lyceum

The Brooklyn Lyceum was the name of both a non-profit organization in Brooklyn, New York, that was active from 1833 through 1843, and the structure which housed that institution. The building Brooklyn Lyceum, located at 182-184 Washington Street, was built in 1835. In 1841 the Brooklyn Apprentices' Library, the first free library in Brooklyn, moved into the building, and the two organizations shared the building until they merged to form the Brooklyn Institute in 1843. The building continued to be known as the Brooklyn Lyceum for two more years until the Brooklyn Lyceum building was purchased in 1845 by Augustus Graham and donated to the Brooklyn Institute at which point the building became known by that name. During its history, the building housed several organizations, often simultaneously, including the Brooklyn City Library, the Brooklyn Institute Free Library, the Youth's Free Library, and The Hamiltonians. The building remained the home of the Brooklyn Institute until it was destroyed by fire in 1890.

== History ==
The non-profit Brooklyn Lyceum organization was formed on October 10, 1833 with the goal of providing "rational amusement, to promote the intellectual and moral improvement of its members, and especially the interests of the young; also to improve the condition of schools, and advance the cause of popular education." The organization began with a series of lectures in November 1833 which were held at Theodore Eames and Samuel Putnam's Brooklynn English and Classical Hall; a boys' school built by Eames and Putnam on Washington Ave. that opened in March 1831. With funds largely provided by the philanthropist Josiah Dow (1782–1850), the organization placed the cornerstone of their own building, also known as the Brooklyn Lyceum, on October 31, 1835. Located at 182-184 Washington Street, the building was built at the intersection of Washington and Concord Streets on the opposite corner from the English and Classical Hall where the Brooklyn Lyceum originally held it meetings.

The Brooklyn Lyceum building housed more than just the activities of the Brooklyn Lyceum organization and multiple organizations used its premises simultaneously. Shortly after the building's completion, the building became the home of The Hamiltonians, a Brooklyn Literary Society that had also previously used the English and Classical Hall. In 1838 the Brooklyn Lyceum of Natural History was founded as a sub-organization under the Brooklyn Lyceum. In 1839 the Brooklyn City Library, a subscription library, was established inside the Brooklyn Lyceum building. It remained active until 1851 when its collection was divided between the Youth's Free Library (also located inside the Brooklyn Lyceum) and the Long Island Historical Society.

In 1841 the Brooklyn Apprentices' Library, the first free library in Brooklyn, moved from its original location in Brooklyn Heights at the corner of Henry and Cranberry Streets into the Brooklyn Lyceum. In 1843 the Brooklyn Lyceum organization and the Brooklyn Apprentices' Library merged to form the Brooklyn Institute (later known as the Brooklyn Institute of Arts). That organization later founded numerous cultural institutions in Brooklyn, including the Brooklyn Museum, the Brooklyn Botanic Garden, the Brooklyn Children's Museum, and the Brooklyn Academy of Music among other cultural, scientific, and education programs.

The Brooklyn Institute founded the Brooklyn Institute Free Library in the building, and a massive renovation of the building was done by the organization in 1868. In 1881 the building was damaged by fire, but was deemed salvageable. The building was destroyed by a second fire in 1890.

== Bibliography ==
- Del Valle, Cezar Joseph (2010). The Brooklyn Theatre Index, Volume II; Manhattan Avenue to York Street. Theatre Talks, LLC. ISBN 9780982772416.
- Stiles, Henry Reed (1867). A History of the City of Brooklyn, Including the Old Town and Village of Brooklyn, the Town of Bushwick, and the Village and City of Williamsburgh. Volumes III. Heritage Books, 2007 republication. ISBN 9780788441653.
