= Barbara Bullock =

American artist

Barbara J. Bullock
- Born: 1938; Philadelphia, Pennsylvania, U.S.
- Known for: Painting
- Movement: abstract
- Awards: Leeway Award, Pew Fellowship in the Arts

Barbara J. Bullock (Nov 24, 1938) is an African American painter, collagist, printmaker, soft sculptor and arts instructor. Her works capture African motifs, African and African American culture, spirits, dancing and jazz in abstract and figural forms. She creates three-dimensional collages, portraits, altars and masks in vibrant colors, patterns and shapes. Bullock produces artworks in series with a common theme and style.

== Early life and education ==
Bullock was born in Philadelphia on Nov 24, 1938, after her father James Bullock moved his family from North Carolina to Philadelphia in the 1930s. They were part of the Great Migration of Black people to the North in search of better opportunities. Her mother Janie McFarland Bullock looked for work at the local armory and her father was a truck driver. The couple separated and Bullock's mother died when she was 12 years old. She, her brother Jack and sister Delores moved in with her father and stepmother Gertrude, who became her second mother. Both of Bullock's paternal grandparents, Rev. Oscar and Mattie Bullock, who visited often from North Carolina, were storytellers, and she grew up listening to their tales.(She would later create an abstract painting titled “Stories My Grandmother Told Me” in 2012.)

Bullock always felt a need to make things and was always in her parents’ basement doing that, she told artist Najee Dorsey in a 2017 interview. “I’ve always been creative. When I was growing up, I needed a language. I realized early on that art was going to be that language,” she told interviewers for a 2015 exhibit of Black artists at the Woodmere Art Museum in Philadelphia.

Bullock also took dancing lessons. She was asked to leave a dance class when she showed up one day with a stray dog and refused to remove it. She quit the class but never gave up on the concept. She participated in the School Art League, an arts program in the public schools. She attended Saturday-morning classes at the Philadelphia Museum School of Art School (now the University of the Arts) and participated in programs at community centers. She became interested in Africa after learning about it in National Geographic magazine and wanted to understand her connection to it.

She attended Roosevelt Junior High School and graduated from Germantown High School in 1958. She was headed to Moore Institute (now Moore College of Art and Design) to study fashion illustration. For three years, she took Saturday-morning painting and drawing classes at the Samuel S. Fleisher Art Memorial in Philadelphia. In 1963, she began taking night classes at Hussian School of Art, which taught commercial art classes. She remained at Hussian until 1966.

== Career ==
=== Portraits ===
Bullock initially painted portraits of famous Americans, friends, and family members. Most of her early works were watercolors. She sought to show the humanity of Black people, she told an interviewer in 1966, but finally decided to paint what she felt.

In the 1960s, she became acquainted with other African American artists in Philadelphia. Several had attended or were attending the prestigious Pennsylvania Academy of the Fine Arts (PAFA): Charles Pridgen, Cranston Walker, Richard Watson. Pridgen, Walter Edmonds and sculptor John Simpson were among those who had their own studios. She hung out with Joe Bailey, Moe Brooker, James Brantley, Charles Searles and Ellen Powell Tiberino to talk about their craft, the lack of exhibition opportunities and other issues. The seasoned artists offered advice and critiques of her work.

Bullock, Tiberino, Reba Dickerson Hill, and Fern Stanford were among the few working Black female artists at the time. Noting that many male artists were supported by their wives and married females were not readily accepted, Bullock decided not to get married. “I married my art,” she stated in the catalog for the Swarthmore College exhibit “Ubiquitous Presence” in 2022.

In 1971, Bullock was named art director of the Ile Ife Black Humanitarian Center, now the Village of Arts and Humanities, founded by dancer and choreographer Arthur Hall, where she stayed until 1975. She taught art techniques to children and young adults. Hall incorporated Yoruba culture, philosophy and spirit entities into the core of the center, which attracted artists, dancers and musicians from all over the world. Funded by the Model Cities Program, the center offered arts, African-inspired dance and music. Bullock met musicians Odean Pope and Max Roach, who also taught there.

Bullock embraced Hall's African sensibility and absorbed it into her own art. Her outlook changed, expanding beyond the teachings of her Catholic upbringing to accept the possibility of a world of spirits that allowed her to connect with her African roots. She took dance lessons from Hall, and she painted the dancers - images that found a permanent place in her works. “I want to express the ritual through dance, the communion of the body and spirit through movement,” she said in an artist statement for her retrospective at the Afro-American Historical and Cultural Museum in 1988.

She taught alongside Charles Pridgen, John Simpson, Charles Searles and Twins Seven Seven, a Nigerian who was the only survivor of seven sets of twins, who had settled in Philadelphia. In his works, Twins Seven Seven connected animals and spirits. Artist Moe Brooker noted that Bullock was among those artists who fed off their African heritage but kept it at a distance as they created their own unique styles.

Twins Seven Seven's influence can be seen in many of Bullock's paintings, including the series “Stilt Dancers,” 1975. She described her artwork as “chasing after spirits.” At one point, Bullock painted an image of an African spirit in a mural on the side of a building, which eventually collapsed. The mural and images – one was of Hall – were recreated by artist Lily Yeh in 2018 on another wall.

Bullock's spirit-based abstract works were dominated by vibrant colors, patterns, rhythmic movement and a cacophony of shapes. She chose black as a predominant color, she said, because she wanted to replace its negative symbolism with power and strength. Her materials included layers of painted paper, fabric, plant fibers, beads, metals, shells, feathers and other small materials. Some of her dancer and animal figures extended outward from the walls when hung. She worked in acrylic and gouache on paper, pen and ink, textured sculptures, figural collages - which she called “shaped paintings”- and three-dimensional wall collages made of heavy paper.

In 1980, she began making altars while researching African culture. She placed them in her home and did not finish, sell or trade them. Made of hand-dyed cloth, raffia, shells, beads, rocks and other objects, they were meant to protect her, she told an interviewer in 1999.

While at Ile Ife, she visited Haiti to learn about its religious practices. She also visited Jamaica and Mexico. With the aid of grants over several decades, Bullock traveled to Ethiopia, Egypt, Mali, Morocco, Senegal, Ghana, Côte d'Ivoire and South Africa. She incorporated into her collages the images she saw and the techniques she observed on her visits to Africa: the land, the black night sky, textiles and masks, and observed ceremonies and other events. “I felt very close to that culture,” she said in a 1983 interview. “In reality, I come from that culture. It’s like getting in touch with yourself.”

Bullock produced series made up of multiple works that, she said, allowed her to fully explore a theme. “Jasmine Gardens,” 1976, included one painting and 300 drawings. “Stilt Walkers” was the first series. The others included “Initiation,” “Night Songs,” “Healers,” “Journey,” “Spirit Houses,” “Chasing After Spirits,” and “Bitches Brew.” Some of her works reflected her feelings toward contemporary issues affecting Black people: “Trayvon Martin, Most Precious Blood,” a teen who was killed by a white Neighborhood Watch volunteer in Florida in 2012, “Katrina," the devastating floods left by that hurricane in New Orleans in 2005, and a portrait of George Floyd, who was killed by a white police officer in Minneapolis, MN, in 2020.

She started researching the series “Jasmine Gardens” during the waning days of Ile Ife, she told an interviewer for an exhibit at the Portland Art Museum in 2017. A painting in the series, “Dark Gods,” which showed two thick Black characters intertwined in each other's grasp, evoked controversy because of its erotic nature. The series was inspired by the naturalism she found in Japanese eroticism and the people's openness about love, she said. Although the figures were male and female, some thought they were males. Bullock chose her artist-friend Deryl Mackie as the male model.

Bullock participated in printmaking programs, including the Experimental Printmaking Institute at Lafayette College. In 2017, PAFA held an exhibit titled “A Collaborative Language” of artists who made prints at the institute, and she was included. In 2008, she was also represented in a show at the Hammonds House Museum in Atlanta of works from the program. The institute donated Bullock's print “Seeing is Believing (2011)” to Woodmere Art Museum.

=== Academia ===
Over four decades, Bullock taught art classes in schools, colleges, community centers and for nonprofits. She completed more than 200 artist-in-residences in Pennsylvania, New Jersey, and Delaware. She conducted mask-making and art classes at local art centers and museums. She trained teachers on integrating art in their school-district curriculums and led classes for inmates in prisons.

In 1978, she was among 18 artists chosen to participate in a Works Progress Administration-style program to employ artists and offer art access to communities. It was conducted under the auspices of the Comprehensive Employment and Training Act and administered by the printmaking Brandywine Workshop. She and the other artists, including Roland Ayers, Bob Thompson, and Cranston Walker, worked at community agencies, community centers and detention centers. Bullock taught classes at Nicetown Boys and Girls Club.

As an artist-in residence, she spent time with elementary and high schools students in several districts, including Shippensburg and York in Pennsylvania, and Sussex in Delaware (where she taught students to paint murals). In Philadelphia, she worked at Prints in Progress, an afterschool printmaking workshop. In New Jersey, she taught art classes from Cape May on the coast to Camden inland. She taught at Arts Horizon where she held classes for students in the Camden (NJ) schools and trained schoolteachers on Rutgers University’s Camden campus. She began making fans while teaching there.

In a five-month residency at the African American Museum in Philadelphia in 1999, she produced a series titled “Journey Series #4, Ethiopia.” It is now part of the museum's collection. She also held a residency at Perkins Center for the Arts in New Jersey.

=== Notable exhibitions ===
Bullock exhibited periodically in group shows in the 1960s with other Black artists. It was hard to find white galleries to show their works, she said, noting that Charles Pridgen, Earl Wilke, Leroy Johnson and Joe Bailey were more aggressive at finding venues at galleries, community centers and churches. Black artists also exhibited in private homes. They were members of the National Conference of Artists, and several exhibited at PAFA in an ancillary show during the conference's 1986 meeting in Philadelphia.

In 1966, Bullock joined John Simpson, Walter Edmonds and Percy Ricks in an exhibit titled “Four Negro Artists” at the Philadelphia Gallery. She showed five works, including a portrait titled “The Staple Singers,” along with “Strange Spring” “Mother and Child,” “Father and Child” and “A Dancer’s World.”

The same year she was in an exhibit of works by young Black artists at the William Penn Memorial Museum in Harrisburg. The artists included Moe Brooker, Walter Edmonds, Ellen Powell Tiberino, Leroy Johnson, Charles Pridgen, Percy Ricks, Walter Gill, John Simpson, Maurice Thompkins, Gwendolyn Joyce Daniels, and Tina Lloyd King. Bullock participated in a benefit show at a lawn party for SNCC (Student Nonviolent Coordinating Committee) in 1975. Others included Pridgen, Simpson and Robert Moore.

In 1969, she was among 200 Black artists in a premier show sponsored by the Philadelphia School District and the Pennsylvania Civic Center Museum. The show featured some of the top names in the country, including Ellen Powell Tiberino, Horace Pippin, Nancy Elizabeth Prophet, Jacob Lawrence, Benny Andrews, Columbus Knox, Roland Ayers, Romare Bearden, Avel de Knight, Barkley Hendricks, Paul Keene, Raymond Saunders, Louis B. Sloan, Ed Wilson, Henry Ossawa Tanner and Joshua Johnson.

Earlier that year, she was represented in the Afro-American Arts Festival that featured 28 Black artists at the Black Student Union at La Salle College. The artists included Janette E. Banks, Turner Battle, Toni Beavers, Benjamin Britt, Harold Carter, Marilyn Coleman, Quetta Consuella, Eugene Fleming, Roy Gibbs, Humbert Howard, Paul Keene, Louis B. Sloan and Howard N. Watson.

While at Ile Ife, Bullock was included in a show with Ellen Powell Tiberino in 1975. The exhibit consisted of 20 paintings, drawings and soft sculpture by the artists. It was their first joint exhibit. Also in 1975, she participated in “Spirits of Forgotten Ancestors” at the Walnut Street Theater, cosponsored by the Philadelphia Museum of Art's Department of Urban Outreach. It consisted of paintings, prints and jewelry by Black artists, including Avel de Knight, Bill Howell, Peg Alston and Wendy Wilson.

In 1988, the Afro-American Historical and Cultural Museum held a retrospective of Bullock's works. In 2005, she was among 41 Black artists in “Chemistry of Color: The Harold A. and Ann R. Sorgenti Collection of African American Art” at PAFA. The show, featuring works from the 1950s to 2005, was a traveling exhibit. In 2002, she won a $35,000 Leeway Foundation Award and was represented in a 2003 exhibit of award winners at the Philadelphia Art Alliance.

In 2010, Sande Webster Gallery featured her works in a group show of women artists titled "Women's Work: A Group Show" that included artists Martina Johnson-Allen, Maya Freelon, Betsy Casanas, Nannette Acker Clark, Alice Oh, Heather Pieters, Doris Nogueira-Rogers, Marta Sanchez and Kathleen Spicer.

In 2014, La Salle University Art Museum hosted an exhibition titled "Barbara Bullock: Straight Water Blues" and, in 2016, published a book titled “Barbara Bullock: Chasing After Spirits,” edited by Klare Scarborough, with contributions by Leslie King-Hammond, Lewis Tanner Moore, Linda Goss, A.M. Weaver, William R. Valerio, and Nannette Acker Clark.

In 2015, Bullock was among artists in the exhibit “WE SPEAK: Black Artists in Philadelphia, 1920s to 1970s” mounted by Woodmere Art Museum. In 2020, Woodmere's “Africa in the Arts of Philadelphia” featured Bullock, Searles and Twins Seven Seven.

In 2022, the List Gallery at Swarthmore College held an exhibit of selected works in “Ubiquitous Presence,” which included oil paintings, sculptures, book arts, prints, altars and mixed media.

In 2023–2024, Woodmere Art Museum hosted a retrospective exhibition titled "Barbara Bullock: Fearless Vision.” It ran from September 2023 to January 2024.

=== Commissions ===
In 1990, Bullock was commissioned by Philadelphia International Airport to produce artwork. She created three-dimensional collages of dancers titled "Releasing the Energy, Balancing the Spirit."

She created “Journey Series #4, Ethiopia” in 1999 for the African American Museum in Philadelphia, commissioned by Chivas Regal as part of its Perspectives program. In 2004, she produced a commemorative poster for the 30th anniversary of the Odunde Festival in Philadelphia. In 2008, she was commissioned by Philadelphia's SEPTA Art in Transit for a work that was installed at the 46th Street Station on the Market-Frankford Line. It is titled "El Dancers."

=== Selected exhibitions ===
Philadelphia Gallery, 1966

Philadelphia Civic Center Museum, 1969, 1981

La Salle University, Black Student Union, 1969

Howard University, 1972, 1985

Ile-Ife Humanitarian Center, 1975

Walnut Street Theater, 1975

Bicentennial Women's Center, 1975

Off the Wall Gallery, Dirty Frank's Bar, 1980, 1981

Cheltenham Art Center, 1983

Villanova University, 1983

Shippensburg University, 1985

Free Library of Philadelphia, 1988

Pennsylvania Academy of the Fine Arts, 1986, 2005, 2017

Suzanne Gross Gallery, 1986

Uptown Theater, 1987

Sande Webster Gallery, 1989, 2010

Bomani Gallery (San Francisco), 1992

Bucks County Community College, 1996

Nexus Gallery, 1997

Rowan University, 1997

Painted Bride Art Center, 1992, 1998

Balch Institute for Ethnic Studies, 1998

Walt Whitman Cultural Center (NJ), 2000

Mercer County Community College, 2001

African American Museum in Philadelphia, 1988, 2002

Philadelphia Art Alliance, 2003

Lafayette College, 2005

Noyes Museum of Art (NJ), 2007

Woodmere Art Museum, 2008, 2014, 2015, 2018, 2020, 2023

Pierro Gallery (NJ), 2010

Seraphin Gallery, 2012, 2013

Atrium gallery, Morris County Administration and Records Building (NJ), 2015

Morris Museum (NJ), 2017

Portland Art Museum, 2017

Swarthmore College, 2022

Zimmerli Art Museum, Rutgers University, 2022

== Collections ==
African American Museum in Philadelphia

Philadelphia Free Library

Zimmerli Art Museum, Rutgers University

Charles H. Wright Museum of African American History, Detroit

Pennsylvania Academy of the Fine Arts

Woodmere Art Museum

Howard University

Lafayette College

La Salle University Art Museum

Robert Wood Johnson

Lewis Tanner Moore Collection of African American Art

Petrucci Family Foundation Collection of African American Art

Philadelphia International Airport

== Commissions ==
Philadelphia International Airport

SEPTA, Art in Transit

Odunde Festival

Chivas Regal's Perspectives program (collage for African American Museum in Philadelphia)
