= We Speak: Black Artists in Philadelphia, 1920s–1970s =

2015–2016 exhibition at Woodmere Art Museum

We Speak: Black Artists in Philadelphia, 1920s–1970s was an art exhibition held at the Woodmere Art Museum from September 26, 2015 through January 24, 2016. It included artists from Philadelphia who were active from the 1920s through the 1970s. Many of those artists were involved with the Pyramid Club and other local organizations. The exhibit included paintings, photographs, prints, drawings and sculpture from the New Negro movement of the 1920s, the Works Progress Administration print works of the 1930s and the Civil rights era.

== Artists ==
The following artists were included in the show:

- James Atkins
- Roland Ayers
- James Brantley
- Benjamin Britt
- Moe Brooker
- Samuel J. Brown
- Barbara Bullock
- Selma Burke
- Donald Eugene Camp
- Barbara Chase-Riboud
- Laura Williams Chassot (b. 1942)
- Claude C.F. Clark
- Louise Clement–Hoff
- Reba Dickerson-Hill
- Aaron Douglas
- John E. Dowell Jr.
- James Dupree
- Allan L. Edmunds
- Walter Edmonds
- Allan R. Freelon, Sr.
- Meta Vaux Warrick Fuller
- Reginald Gammon
- John T. Harris
- Barkley L. Hendricks
- Humbert L. Howard
- Edward Ellis Hughes
- Charles Jay, (b. 1947)
- LeRoy Johnson
- Martina Johnson-Allen
- Edward Jones (b. 1942)
- Ida Jones
- Paul F. Keene Jr.
- Columbus Knox
- Edward L. Loper Sr.
- John W. Mosley
- Jerry Pinkney
- Horace Pippin
- Charles Aaron Pridgen
- Raymond Saunders
- Charles Searles
- Twins Seven Seven
- Louis Sloan
- Raymond Steth
- Henry Ossawa Tanner
- Dox Thrash
- Ellen Powell Tiberino
- Laura Wheeler Waring
- Howard Watson
- Richard J. Watson
- Deborah Willis
