= Columbus P. Knox =

American artist

- Born: 1923
- Died: 1999 (aged 75–76)
- Known for: painter, muralist, illustrator and printmaker

Columbus P. Knox (1923–1999) was a painter, muralist, illustrator and printmaker. He was a mainstay at the annual Rittenhouse Square Fine Arts Show in Philadelphia, the oldest outdoor art exhibition in the country. His works are in museums and private collections. Knox created his own style of painting: using brushstrokes that resembled a rake being pulled through sand.

== Early life and education ==
Columbus Pearl Knox was born on September 14, 1923, to Mary B. and William P. Knox who had moved from Virginia to Philadelphia to build a better life for their family. He learned to draw by looking over the shoulder of his older brother Norman as he drew. He copied what he saw. At age seven, he used small pieces of plaster of paris to draw on the streets in South Philadelphia where he grew up. In school, his teacher allowed him to decorate the bulletin board and classroom, and he illustrated his assignments with his artwork. After school, he headed over to the community center at St. Simons Church to draw and paint.

Knox was also mentored by teachers at Barratt Junior High School and Central High (now Ben Franklin High) where one teacher exhibited his works. He garnered several awards. The teachers recognized his ability – as he himself did - and arranged for a scholarship to art school. He put it off to join the Army in 1943.

After the war he resumed his arts education and attended the Philadelphia Museum School of Industrial Art (now University of the Arts) while freelancing at Leonard Studios Mural Arts Co. and his brother's company, Reliance Art Service.

Knox worked full time as an illustrator and graphic artist and part-time as a fine-art painter. He was assistant director in charge of graphics at the Naval Supply Depot in Philadelphia, a graphics field representative for Philco/Ford and a publication specialist in the U.S. Department of Labor's Mine Safety and Health administration and art director of its magazine. He retired from the Labor job in the late 1980s. He created graphics for several government agencies and private firms. He freelanced for such companies as the Franklin Mint, All-American Comics, Time-Life Books and several book publishers.

== His artwork and exhibitions ==
Knox painted in watercolor, oil, pencil, pastels and acrylics. Most of his themes related to African American culture, and his works are identifiable through his brushstroke style of painting. He signed his works in a stylistic “CPKnox,” connecting the letters.

“I used to enter in different shows and I would walk around and it looked like everybody was painting the same thing,” he said. “So I tried to do something a little differently. That’s when I started using the brushstroke. Nobody’s doing it because it’s completely different from any of the old masters.” By 1996, he had been using it for the past 17 years.

One of his first paintings out of art school was “Charging Warriors” about Sudanese warriors fighting the British in the 19th century. His painting “Pebbles,” an oil of a little Black girl in bifocals, won him first prize in an art competition. His other oil paintings included “Inez’s Holy Communion,” “Dancing Watusi” and “Black Madonna.” The oil “Project Blues” is in the collection of the Gibbes Museum of Art in Charleston, SC.

Knox was chosen for commissions, illustrated comic and coloring books, posters and calendars, and participated in many local exhibitions, making him a well-known artist and go-to person. He was a familiar face at the Rittenhouse Square Fine Arts Show, which began in 1928 as the Rittenhouse Clothesline Exhibition.

He painted a life-size portrait of Dr. Martin Luther King Jr. that hangs at the school that bears the name of the civil rights leader.

Knox was involved with the Odunde Festival in Philadelphia, illustrating the annual commemorative posters sold by the organization as a fundraiser. He also illustrated a coloring book “Odunde Means Happy New Year” in 1990.

He exhibited often with the West Philadelphia Cultural Alliance's annual “Celebrating the Arts” and illustrated the organization's fundraising calendars. He also was a perennial artist in October Gallery's annual Art Expo in Philadelphia.

Knox was represented in a Free Library of Philadelphia exhibit of prints by Black artists living in the Philadelphia metropolitan area. Several of those works were by artists who participated in the Works Projects Administration during the Depression, including Samuel J. Brown Jr., Dox Thrash and Raymond Steth. The prints were in the collection of the library, which mounted the exhibit in 1992"

In 1952, Knox helped create an “exotic frame-background” for a fashion show sponsored by the United Negro Assembly, of which he was a member of its Art Committee. The organization held an event at the Pyramid Club that year to encourage Black businesses to advertise. The event presented advertising art, layouts and copy by Black artists and ad designers.

In 1984, he illustrated an anti-graffiti comic book written by a Philadelphia School District educator. The workbook, which featured a multicultural group of friends, grew out of a 1976 book titled “Quadrus & Goliath” by Alvin Lester Ben-Moring. It was designed as an education tool in the middle grades.

In 1994, Knox exhibited at the MARC Studio Art Museum in “Untold West,” featuring three artists who used the American West as a theme in their works. The cover image for the show's invitation was a Knox painting of a Black cowboy during a rodeo.

He painted African subjects but he never visited the continent, relying on friends to bring back items from there and the Caribbean. “I have a photographic memory and once I see something I remember it and can paint from my memory,” he once said.

In 1969, he was one of 200 Black artists from across the country to participate in a major exhibition titled “Afro-American Artists 1800-1969,” sponsored by the Philadelphia School District and the Philadelphia Civic Center Museum. The exhibit included the works of Ellen Powell Tiberino, Horace Pippin, Barbara Bullock, Nancy Elizabeth Prophet, Jacob Lawrence, Benny Andrews, Roland Ayers, Romare Bearden, Avel de Knight, Barkley Hendricks, Paul Keene, Raymond Saunders, Louis B. Sloan, Ed Wilson, Henry Ossawa Tanner and Joshua Johnson. In 1988, he was represented in an exhibit at the Afro-American Historical and Cultural Museum in Philadelphia of works from its collection. Titled “Rejuvenating a Collection: Ford Foundation Artists and Acquisitions,” it featured 32 works from some “prominent” local artists.

== Later years ==
Knox's paintings took on a religious theme. Several of those themed works were included in two exhibits in 1997. The Minority Arts Resource Council presented a show titled “Religion Through Brown Eyes” at the William J. Green Federal Building.

His “Black Madonna” was shown at the Balch Institute for Ethnic Studies in “Art and Religion: The Many Faces of Faith.” The exhibit included commentary from the artists on the subject. Knox wrote of his experiences as a Black soldier during World War II, noting that Black soldiers had to turn in their weapons while whites did not, that two his best friends were killed by whites and that Black soldiers were told they would not be discharged because they lied about being in combat.

Knox was painting right until the end. The Saturday before he died on June 8, 1999, he was at Rittenhouse Square selling his artwork. Dizyners Gallery, where he had exhibited often, held a memorial show in his honor titled “Distinctively Knox” a year later.

Knox's work was included in the 2015 exhibition We Speak: Black Artists in Philadelphia, 1920s-1970s at the Woodmere Art Museum.

== Collections ==
- African American Museum in Philadelphia
- Petrucci Family Foundation Collection of African American Art
- The Melvin Holmes Collection of African American Art
- Free Library of Philadelphia, Print and Picture Collection
- Gibbes Museum of Art
- Davis Museum, Wellesley College
- Philadelphia School District, Martin Luther King High School

== Exhibitions ==
- Philadelphia Civic Center Museum, 1969
- Custom Frame Shop and Gallery, 1971
- The Building Gallery, 1973
- Rittenhouse Square Clothesline Exhibition, 1975
- Camden County Library, 1976
- Peirce Junior College, 1986
- West Philadelphia Regional Library, 1988,1989
- Penn Tower Hotel, October Gallery, 1988
- Uptown Visual Arts Complex, 1988
- Heritage Art Gallery, 1989, 1990
- Esther M. Klein Gallery, University City Science Center, 1990
- University of the Arts, Haviland Hall Gallery, 1991
- Free Library of Philadelphia, 1992
- New Jersey State Aquarium at Camden, 1993
- Crescent Boat Club #5, Boat House Row, 1993
- Chosen Image African American Art Gallery, 1994
- Dizyners Gallery, 1997, 1999, 2000
- Minority Arts Resource Council, William J. Green Federal Building, 1997
- Balch Institute for Ethnic Studies, 1997
- MARC Studio Art Museum, 1998
- Afro-American Historical and Cultural Museum, 1998
- Delaware Center for the Contemporary Arts, 2008
- Woodmere Art Museum 2008, 2015
