= Louis B. Sloan =

African American landscape artist

Louis Baynard Sloan
- self portrait, 1956
- Born: June 28, 1932; Philadelphia, Pennsylvania
- Died: October 15, 2008 (aged 76)
- Education: Pennsylvania Academy of the Fine Arts

Louis B. Sloan (1932 – 2008) was an American landscape artist, teacher and conservator. He was the first Black full professor at the Pennsylvania Academy of the Fine Arts (PAFA), and a conservator for the academy and the Philadelphia Museum of Art. Although he painted urban neighborhoods and other cityscapes, he was mostly known for his plein-air paintings.

== Early life and education ==
Louis Baynard Sloan was born on June 28, 1932, in West Philadelphia, to parents Matthew and Anna Mae Sloan. His father lost his job as an auto mechanic during the Depression and then gave piano lessons to feed the family of 12 children (he was no. 5). His mother was a housewife who gave piano lessons until her family began to grow.

Sloan's older brother Beauford sparked his interest in art at an early age. His sixth-grade teacher at Alexander Wilson Elementary School, Mrs. Cordelia McKrantz, encouraged his drawing by buying him his first oil paints. "That set of oils was what really shaped my life, directed it into art," he said years later. He sold his first painting at age 14.

One of his professional mentors was the artist Julius Bloch, then a teacher at PAFA, who saw Sloan's works in the Gimbels Exhibition of Student Art shows and urged him to attend PAFA. For the department store's 1953 competition, an oil painting by the 19-year-old Sloan was featured in an ad in the Philadelphia Inquirer announcing the exhibition.

Another supporter was artist Jack Bookbinder, director of art programs for the School District of Philadelphia, who encouraged him to study at the Samuel S. Fleischer Art Memorial. Sloan attended free classes at Fleischer; some of his duties, though, were to clean the painting palettes of white students. (He taught at Fleischer in 1960.) He also took painting classes at the Philadelphia Museum of Art.

When Sloan was 11 years old, he sat for Bookbinder, who drew a portrait of him playing a harmonica titled "The Spiritual". He gave Sloan a lithograph of the 1946 painting, but it was lost in a fire in the 1950s. Years later, Bookbinder presented him with a reprint he made in 1969. A child prodigy, Sloan in 1951 drew an on-the-spot "creative picture" as another young man played the piano during an annual concert on youths and the arts. At his graduation ceremony at Ben Franklin High School in 1953, he won an award for an outstanding work in art. He was considered one of the best students to graduate from the school.

== Student at Pennsylvania Academy of the Fine Arts ==
Sloan won a scholarship to attend PAFA. He became a star student at the academy, racking up several major awards. He attended PAFA from 1953 to 1957, graduating with a certificate. Early on, a local group associated with the school district gave him money for carfare and supplies.

His awards at PAFA:

- 1954 – student-show prize-winner, annual Fellowship (alumni) exhibition
- 1955 – Board of Directors' Prize
- 1955 – Henry J. Thouron Prize
- 1955 – honorable mention, landscape prize
- 1955 – Catherine Grant Memorial Prize for best landscape. This was the first year of the award.
- 1956 – J. Henry Schiedt Traveling Scholarship, two months abroad. He traveled in Europe with fellow Black student Raymond Saunders, who that year won a William Emlen Cresson Memorial Traveling Scholarship (two years)
- 1957 – Charles Toppan award
- 1957 – student-show prize-winner, annual Fellowship (alumni) exhibition

In 1955, Sloan's painting "Backyards," completed that year, was gifted to PAFA by a patron. In 1956, he painted a self-portrait of him standing in front of rowhouses bathed in light, now in the PAFA collection.

During his second year at PAFA in 1954, Sloan exhibited at the Red Door Gallery, and again in 1957 as part of an exhibit by PAFA, the Tyler School of Art at Temple University and the Philadelphia Museum and School of industrial Art (now University of the Arts). This was the first in a series of exhibits shown in the West Oak Lane neighborhood of the best works by graduating students of the three schools.

== The years beyond PAFA ==
The early 1960s were just as fruitful for Sloan, who became PAFA's first Black full-time faculty member in 1962. He also picked up some more art awards:

- 1960 - Wilkie Buick Regional Exhibition, second prize for his painting "Hillside".
- 1960, 1961 - Louis Comfort Tiffany Foundation Grant
- 1962 - Jennie Sesnan Gold Medal, for "Gathering Storm over Philadelphia".
- 1962 - Emily Lowe Grant
- 1962 - Tobeleah Wechsler 2nd Prize, for "Pennsylvania Landscape", Cheltenham Center for the Arts.
- In 1963, Sloan won a John Simon Guggenheim Memorial Fellowship to travel in the United States. He chose to go South, leaving in the fall of that year.
- In 1969, he was among 100 Black artists from across the country to participate in the exhibit “Afro-American Artists 1800-1969” sponsored by the School District of Philadelphia and the Philadelphia Civic Center Museum. It included works by some of the country’s top artists, including Horace Pippin, Nancy Elizabeth Prophet, Jacob Lawrence, Benny Andrews, Roland Ayers, Romare Bearden, Avel de Knight, Barkley Hendricks, Paul Keene, Raymond Saunders, Ellen Powell Tiberino, Ed Wilson, Henry Ossawa Tanner and Joshua Johnson.
- In 2019, the Noyes Museum of Art in Stockton, NJ, included Sloan's works in a group exhibition titled "Driving While Black". The catalog told the story of what he encountered during his year-long trip in a Volkswagen van in the midst of the civil rights movement. Sloan experienced racial prejudice and segregation. He was forbidden from staying in hotels and motels, and was confronted with "Whites Only" signs. He had to find Black neighborhoods that would accommodate him.
- Sloan's works were presented in several shows in 1963, including PAFA's annual alumni exhibition; Bryn Mawr College's show of young Philadelphia artists who were graduates of the academy, and Towne Gallery's exhibit that included his paintings "Wissahickon" and "Susquehanna". In 1969 at La Salle University’s Black Student Union, he was among 28 artists in the African American Arts Festival, including Howard N. Watson, Benjamin Britt, Humbert Howard, Barbara Bullock and Paul Keene.
- In 1975, he won the Earth II Purchase Award during an exhibit sponsored by the Junior League of Philadelphia at Children's Hospital of Philadelphia. His painting "A Field of Daisies" was purchased by Friends of Earth II for the hospital, which each May celebrated daisy days as a fundraiser.

Sloan was an assistant conservator of paintings at PAFA in the early 1960s and the Philadelphia Museum of Art from 1961until 1980. At the museum in 1961, he helped repair Thomas Eakins' 1875 oil painting "The Gross Clinic".

In 1985 he performed conservation work on the 19th-century painting "The Phoenix" by African American artist David Bustill Bowser for the Philadelphia Alumnae chapter of Delta Sigma Theta sorority. The painting had been found in storage at the Atwater Kent Museum.

Early in his career, Sloan was involved with the Pyramid Club.

== Sloan as teacher and mentor ==
Sloan taught at PAFA from 1962 to 1997. He was described as a kind, gentle and soft-spoken man who mentored many Black and white students. He took his students on annual painting trips to the Catskills, the Delaware Water Gap and the Poconos Mountains in Pennsylvania, and to a camp in the Adirondack Mountains in New York state near Split Rock Falls along Lake Champlain. He painted what some consider one of his best works "Spirit" at the Adirondack camp there. He would also take his students to spots in the Philadelphia region. He had been taking these outdoor trips since the 1960s, sketching and fishing in the summer and painting from the sketches in the wintertime.

His student Barkley Hendricks, who became an internationally known artist, recalled seeing Sloan bundled against the cold with his brushes and easels. Sloan loved the outdoors. "Being outside is wonderful," he told a reporter.

As a child, Sloan's parents taught him to play the piano. He learned to play by ear and could remember a piece in his mind long after he could no longer hear it. He painted landscapes the same way, he said. If he saw something that excited him, he would capture it his mind and paint it from memory.

Sloan retired in 1997. Along with teaching at PAFA, Sloan was a guest instructor in landscape painting at the Barn Studio of Art in Millville, New Jersey, during the 1980s.

== Sloan as a "Black" artist ==
Black art historian and collector Lewis Tanner Moore described Sloan as a "quiet giant of American art". Hendricks considered him an un-appreciated and under-valued artist because of the genre he chose as a Black artist - landscapes.

"Louis Sloan was an under-recognized painter who happened to be a 'Black Artist' who didn't do "black art". His main focus was the beauty of the planet; landscapes were an example of his raison d'etre. This was not a body of work that curators or museums at that time wanted to know about. After all, it was the 1960's and 1970's, a time of flux and confusion, when searching for someone who could paint, period, was not 'au courant.' Curatorial initiatives as well as artists of the time seemed to be in search of personal and racial identity in and via art."

Sloan did not see himself as a Black artist in the sense that he painted Black subjects. The Noyes Museum of Art noted in its catalog for "Driving While Black" that "he was an artist, in his, and its own right, without the need for racial stereotype labelling. He would say that ‘my art has to stand on its own and speak for itself.' He also said, 'there is only one reason a person should paint, and that's because they love to paint, no other reason.'"

Sloan supported Black artists as students and professionals. In 1975, he organized an exhibit titled "Black Perspective On Art" in New York City, sponsored by Black Enterprise magazine. He also influenced a number of artists, including Leroy Johnson.

== Later years ==
In 1991, he received the James Van Der Zee Award from the Brandywine Workshop for mentoring young artists, and the PAFA Distinguished Faculty Award. In 1994, Sloan was included in a photo display of the lives and works of 10 local Black artists at the African American Museum in Philadelphia. A Landscape and Still Life Prize was created in his name at PAFA in 1997.

Sloan died of a heart attack October 15, 2008.

Sloan's work was included in the 2015 exhibition We Speak: Black Artists in Philadelphia, 1920s-1970s at the Woodmere Art Museum.

== Collections ==
- Pennsylvania Academy of the Fine Arts
- La Salle University Art Museum
- Sheldon Museum of Art
- Woodmere Art Museum
- Philadelphia Museum of Art
- African American Museum in Philadelphia
- Tarboro (NC) Arts Commission
- Rutgers University-Camden
- Petrucci Family Foundation Collection of African American Art

== Exhibitions ==
- Red Door Gallery, 1954, 1957
- Pennsylvania Academy of the Fine Arts, 1962, 1963, 1999, 2005, 2008, 2009, 2021
- Cheltenham Center for the Arts, 1962
- Bryn Mawr College, 1963 N
- Towne Gallery, 1963 1963
- Heritage House Galleries, 1963
- Peale House Galleries, Pennsylvania Academy of the Fine Arts, 1964, 1967
- Samuel S. Fleischer Art Memorial, 1966
- Lee Cultural Center, 1967
- Cultural Arts Center, Ocean City (NJ), 1968
- Afro-American Artists 1800-1969, Philadelphia Civic Center Museum, 1969
- Philadelphia Ethical Society, 1969
- Afro-American Art Festival, La Salle College, 1969
- Vendo Nubes Gallery, 1972
- Millville Public Library, 1972
- American Painters in Paris, 1975
- Earth Art II, Junior League of Philadelphia, 1975
- Reese Palley Fine Arts Gallery, Atlantic City, 1975
- Woodmere Art Museum, 1978, 1980, 2014, 2015
- Stedman Gallery, 1978
- Deshong Museum, Widener University, 1981
- Olympia Galleries LTD, Atlanta, 1982
- Gloucester County College, 1987
- Pittman Memorial Gallery, Tarboro (NC), 1987
- Windy Bush Gallery, 1996
- Moore College of Art & Design, 1997
- Hahn Gallery, 1997, 1998, 2001, 2004
- African American Museum in Philadelphia, 2002
- Noyes Museum of Art, 2019
