= LeRoy Johnson (artist) =

American artist (1937–2022)

Leroy Johnson
- Born: 1937; Philadelphia, Pennsylvania, U.S.
- Died: July 8, 2022 (aged 85); Philadelphia, Pennsylvania, U.S.
- Education: Lincoln University
- Known for: mixed media, collage, ceramics, sculptures
- Awards: Pew Center for Arts and Heritage

Leroy Johnson (1937 – July 8, 2022) was a largely self-taught African American artist who used found materials to create mixed-media works. He was known for his paintings, assemblage sculptures and collages that were inspired, influenced and reflective of African American history and his experiences living in the inner city of Philadelphia.

== Early life and education ==
Leroy Johnson was born in 1937 in the Eastwick community of Southwest Philadelphia to Harry and Louetta Cowan Johnson. His father worked as a janitor at the Frankford Arsenal. When Johnson was about 7 or 8 years old, he read Richard Wright’s novel “Native Son,” and asked his mother who wrote it, he said in video interviews. She said it was written by a “colored man,” he said. Then he heard a voice telling him that he would be an artist, and so he did, according to Johnson. As a child, he said, he enjoyed drawing and reading, and he copied cartoons. Will Eisner was among his favorite cartoonists, along with Milton Caniff, who drew “Terry and the Pirates.” He was also exposed to Life, Ebony and Jet magazines. He often visited the Free Library of Philadelphia.

Johnson attended John Bartram High School, where he took commercial art classes. He won an award for sculpture in the Gimble Department Store Art Exhibit. As a student at Bartram, he and four of his commercial-art classmates formed an arts league. Johnson graduated in 1955. In 1957, the arts league made plans to mount an exhibit of their paintings, watercolors and sculptures. They told a newspaper reporter that they were planning to hold it at St. Cyprian Episcopal Church in the Elmwood section of Southwest Philadelphia but had not yet gotten permission from the Rev. Paul Washington, its pastor. All five were working other jobs, Johnson at the Philadelphia Quartermaster Depot.

Johnson did not attend art school to obtain a degree. He told one interviewer that art schools homogenized students into one way of thinking and he prided himself on being original. He studied at the Samuel S. Fleisher Art Memorial, the Philadelphia College of Art (now the University of the Arts) and the Haystack Mountain School of Crafts in Maine. He earned a master’s degree in human services from Lincoln University in 1988. He got his master’s degree, he said, after being kicked out of a teaching at a private school because he didn’t have the right credentials.

Johnson began his art career primarily as a painter until he saw huge pots in a crafts magazine when he was 22 years old in the early 1960s. He began taking clay classes at Fleisher. He bought a house in North Philadelphia and installed a wheel and kiln in his basement. He sold ceramics with sumi-e style decoration to the John Wanamaker department store and other shops under the name "John LeRoy," he said, because the name "Leroy Johnson" sounded "too Black." He stopped the imitations, he said, and began focusing on African art.

== Artistic influences ==
Horace Pippin was one of his favorite artists, he said, and Pippin’s painting “Giving Thanks” reminded him of his own life as a child. The painting showed a wood-burning stove, a metal iron for pressing clothes, the family seated at a table ready for a meal, as well as quilts, blankets and rugs, he said. The painting represented “a desire and need forged in migration, war, and existence in a nation where terrorism still confronted African Americans,” Johnson wrote for his art residency at the Clay Studio in Philadelphia from 1995-2001.

Both artists and writers inspired Johnson, he said, including novelist Ralph Ellison. “Ben Shahn and Upton Sinclair, that whole milieu gave me the idea that art was about being aware of society, being aware of people and being involved in that,” Johnson said. “That’s what I thought art was. I never thought it was just being able to do a pretty picture.” He also was inspired by the work of artists who he said were improvisational: Thornton Dial, Lonnie Holley, Romare Bearden, Beauford Delaney, Ashcan School artists and Louis B. Sloan. Johnson was also influenced by musicians, including John Coltrane, Biggie Smalls and Jimi Hendricks. The artists of the Arte Povera Movement were also influential, he said, in encouraging him to use objects and materials from his neighborhood to add texture to his works.

Johnson was also influenced by jazz, he said, and incorporated its rhythms in his artworks and community work. He curated a show for the city of Philadelphia’s Jazz Appreciation Month festivities in 2018. He chose works that showed the artist’s exploration and interpretation of jazz. A year later, he was featured in an exhibit of jazz-inspired works at the city’s Art in City Hall space.

== Artistic message ==
Johnson described himself as “urban expressionist.” He used discarded materials to inform his artwork. These included photos of people, buildings, rowhouses, streets, train cars, local shops, industrial architecture, advertising, graffiti, neon store signs, and the elevated “El” train in Philadelphia. He worked in mixed media, clay, collage and sculpture. At one point, he dug up clay across Philadelphia to shape into ceramic pieces. He produced some ceramics when he was a resident artist at the Clay Studio. He used the found materials to layer collages and build miniature three-dimensional roughly constructed houses. He incorporated clay into these structures. Johnson began making the tabletop rowhouses around 1992-1993, and they represented the dilapidated structures in his neighborhood.

“African American culture has been shaped by traumatic history, because it contains the memory of a hard, unclean break from Africa," he said. "That is why my work sometimes appears subversive, disruptive and skeptical. I feel I continue the tradition of African American artists and take a stand for freedom, justice and empowerment."

Johnson produced several series of mixed-media work: "Street Scenes," which featured rowhouses and surrounding streets in his neighborhood; "Lynching Series," collages consisting of Bible verses, crosses and news clippings pertaining to lynching in America, and "Men with Hats," relief images of men, including his own "Self-Portrait, Mourning" (2000). He got the idea for one of the pieces - of a man whose large nose covered the top of his lips - from a drawing done by one of his elementary school students. He also created the "Brickyard Series," the name of a neighborhood where he lived.

Johnson intentionally misspelled wording on some of the street signs in his structures to "combat ignorance of African American accomplishments," noted an essay for a solo exhibit in 2004 at Swarthmore College's List Gallery. In the work "Untitled (House)," he spelled the name of abolitionist Cyrus Bustill (great-great-grandfather of activist Paul Robeson) as "Bustil" and Robeson as "Roberson." In another piece, he identified Crispus Attucks as Crispus Attackus.

Johnson was involved in the Black Arts Movement in Philadelphia in the 1960s and 1970s, he said. In 1993, Johnson joined Recherche, an organization of Black artists founded a decade before. It was formed to expand the definition of Black artists as an eclectic group of people who worked in a variety of mediums, and to plan and mount their own exhibits. Its founders were Syd Carpenter, James Dupree, Carolyn Hayward-Jackson, Richard Jordan, Charles Searles, Hubert C. Taylor and Andrew Turner. Among the other members was Moe Brooker.

== Teaching art ==
Johnson was a teacher, therapist, counselor, school principal. He was an artist in residence at Roman Catholic High School as part of the Philadelphia Museum of Art Education Program, an instructor in the Clay Studio's Claymobile at Dick and Meade Elementary Schools, and art therapist at Meade, and an artist in residence at Swarthmore Rutledge School.

Johnson taught art at several community venues. In 1992, he conducted a ceramics workshop for beginners and families at the Afro-American Historical and Cultural Museum in Philadelphia (now the African American Museum in Philadelphia). A year later, he returned for a craft workshop for children at the museum. At the Philadelphia Zoo in 1991, he conducted a mask-making workshop as part of Black History Month.

In 1991, he taught pottery and ceramics to troubled youths with behavioral problems at the Touchstone Center for the Arts in Farmington, PA. The students - from Pennsylvania and West Virginia - attended Pressley Ridge School at Ohiopyle.

In 2003, Johnson taught and coached community people, students and nuns to produce a mural at the St. Frances Academy community center in Baltimore. They created a ceramic mosaic mural depicting Africa, and civil rights leaders and symbols. Its title “And Still I Rise” was taken from Maya Angelou’s poem of the same name. He participated in Temple University’s Tyler School of Art and Architecture series “Race, Identity and Experience in American Art” course in 2022. He discussed his life and work.

== Exhibits, residencies and awards ==
In 1966, Johnson was one of 12 local artists in an “Exhibition of Contemporary Negro Art” at the William Penn Memorial Museum in Harrisburg, PA. More than 70 artworks by young Black artists and students were represented. Other Philadelphia artists included Moe Brooker, Ellen Powell (Tiberino), Barbara Bullock, Walter Edmonds, Charles Pridgen and Percy Ricks.

In 1969, he was selected for a major exhibit of 100 artists titled “Afro American Artists 1800-1969” sponsored by the Philadelphia School District and the Museum of the Philadelphia Civic Center. It consisted of more than 250 paintings, sculptures and graphics of both past and contemporary Black artists. Johnson was one about three dozen local artists chosen to be shown, including Ellen Powell Tiberino. In 1988, he was among four artists featured in an exhibit titled “Directions 4" at the Afro-American Historical and Cultural Museum. The others were Benjamin Britt, Oscar Page and Deryl Mackie. Johnson was described as an abstract expressionist.

Johnson was resident artist at the Clay Studio from 1995-2001, where he taught at its school and the Claymobile, its outreach program. In 2019, he was selected for the Mural Arts Studio Artist-in-Residence at the Barnes Foundation where he produced paintings and sculptures pertaining to the Civil War. He was selected for a three-month residency in a program called “Let’s Connect,” co-sponsored by the Barnes and Mural Arts Philadelphia. He worked inside a fishbowl studio where the public could watch him create.

In 1997, he held a residency sponsored by the New Community Corporation and the Montclair Art Museum in New Jersey. He worked with residents and students to create three-dimensional artworks for the public courtyards at New Community. At the time, he was an art therapist working with at-risk teens, as well as teaching workshops at Village of Arts and Humanities in Philadelphia. He was selected as the Peter Benoliel Fellow at the Center for Emerging Visual Artists in Philadelphia in a two-year fellowship in 2019 and an artist in residence at the center in 2021, where he sat up his studio in its gallery. He was also an artist in residence at the Fitler Club from 2019-2021, one of its original artists in residence. His works were featured in the inaugural exhibition of the club’s newest art space “Offsite.”

In 1999, he exhibited at the Tirza Yalon Kolton Ceramic Gallery in Tel Aviv, and conducted workshops in Israel.

In 2012, Johnson was commissioned to contribute artwork to the Juvenile Justice Services Center in Philadelphia. Johnson's process in creating artwork was featured in a short film titled "Red Brick, Green Grass, Blue Sky". He was awarded a Pew Center for Arts and Heritage fellowship in 2014, among others.

In 2015, he was in a major exhibit mounted by the Woodmere Art Museum titled We Speak: Black Artists in Philadelphia, 1920s-1970s. He was represented three years later in Woodmere's Annual exhibition.

== Death ==
Leroy Johnson died from lung cancer in Philadelphia, on July 8, 2022, at the age of 85.

== Selected exhibitions ==
William Penn Memorial Museum, Harrisburg, PA, 1966

Philadelphia Art Alliance, 1968, 1992

Community Art Gallery of Friends Neighborhood Guild, 1968

“Afro-American Artists: 1800-1969,” Philadelphia School District and Museum of the Philadelphia Civic Center, 1969

Villanova University Art Gallery, 1983

Louis Belcastro Gallery, Philadelphia, 1984

Afro-American Historical and Cultural Museum, 1988, 1990, 2006

Limerance Gallery, 1989

Esther M. Klein Art Gallery, University City Science Center, 1990

Camden County Historical Society, 1990

Showcase Art Gallery, 1992

Sande Webster Gallery, 1993, 2000

Cheltenham Center for the Arts, 1996

Show of Hands Gallery, Philadelphia, 1996

Clay Studio, Philadelphia, 1997, 1999, 2000

Balch Institute for Ethnic Studies/Villanova University, 1997

Gloucester County College, 1998

Art Gallery at City Hall, Philadelphia, 1998, 2015, 2017, 2019

Tirza Yalon Kolton Ceramic Gallery, Tel Aviv, Israel, 1999

Campbell Hall Gallery, Western Oregon University, 2000

Society for Contemporary Craft, Pittsburgh, 2000

American Jazz Museum, Kansas City, MO, 2002

Painted Bride Art Center, 2003, 2017

Swarthmore College, List Gallery, 2004

Berman Museum of Art, Ursinus College, 2006

Hearne Fine Art, Little Rock, AR, 2007

HUB Gallery, HUB-Robeson Center, Pennsylvania State University, 2006, 2008

Woodmere Art Museum, Philadelphia, 2008, 2015, 2018

Philadelphia's Magic Gardens, 2011

Philadelphia Free Library, collaborative installation “Street Café" and ephemeral display, 2012, 2017

Contemporary Craft, 2013

Judiciary Art Exhibit Program, Robert C. Byrd Federal Courthouse, Charleston, WV, Works from the Collection of Harvey and Jennifer Peyton, 2013

University City Arts League, 2016

Marginal Utility, Philadelphia, 2018

Grizzly Grizzly, 2018

Art at Kings Oaks, Newtown, PA 2019

Fitler Club, 2019, 2020

Tiger Strikes Asteroid Philadelphia, 2021

Center for Emerging Visual Artists, 2021

Gross McCleaf Gallery, 2022

Margot Samel Gallery, 2025

== Selected collections ==
American Museum of Ceramic Art, Pomona, California

Harvey and Jennifer Peyton Collection, Charleston, WV

Clay Studio, Philadelphia

Juvenile Justice Services Center, Philadelphia, PA
