= Howard N. Watson =

American artist (1929–2022)

- Born: Howard Noel Watson; May 19, 1929; Pottsville, Pennsylvania, U.S.
- Died: July 15, 2022 (aged 93); Glenside, Pennsylvania, U.S.
- Known for: Watercolorist, illustrator, landscape artist, teacher

Howard N. Watson (May 19th, 1929–July 15th, 2022) was an African-American watercolorist, landscape artist, illustrator and teacher. He was known for his impressionistic watercolors of historical buildings, streets, neighborhoods and landmarks in the Philadelphia region.

== Early life and family history ==
Howard Noel Watson was born on May 19, 1929, in Pottsville, Pennsylvania, to James B. and Lillie E. Hunter Watson, the youngest of his parents' three boys. His father was a cartoonist and illustrator for the Baltimore Afro-American newspaper and a well-known photo engraver, commercial artist and sign painter (he also made posters for some local theaters). James B. Watson owned an engraving shop and did work for several newspapers in the Pottsville, Schuylkill County, area. He drew the cartoon "Amos Hokum" for the Afro-American newspaper in Baltimore starting in 1923 and wrote a humor column of the same name. In 1926, the weekly comic strip was put on hiatus for 10 years, and he resumed it in 1936 until around 1942. The strip was syndicated in the Pittsburgh Courier and the New York Amsterdam News. He also drew editorial cartoons for the Afro-American. As a boy, Howard sat next to his father as he drew cartoons, and he allowed the young Howard to erase any mistakes.

Both Howard Watson and his middle brother James loved drawing, and Watson was drawn to landscapes. In junior high school, his art teacher Isabel Zerbe introduced him to watercolors and encouraged him to become an artist. In high school, he was more into music than art. He graduated from Pottsville High School in 1947, and attended Pennsylvania State University's Pottsville Undergraduate Center (now Penn State Schuylkill), majoring in art and music. He played basketball and baseball, and was president of the school's art club.

In 1948, when Watson was 19 years old and a freshman at Penn State, several of his works were reviewed by prominent New York artists Chaim Gross and Moses Soyer. According to a newspaper article, Watson was hoping to get a four-year scholarship to the Cranbrook Institute of Design in Michigan (this was most likely the Cranbrook Academy of Art). Gross wrote that he was impressed by Watson's use of color and composition. Soyer agreed, adding that he was more impressed by Watson's potential.

With too few art classes offered at Penn State, Watson left to join the Air Force in 1950. He wanted to go into the Navy, but he could not swim. Once in the Air Force, he said in an interview, he learned to swim in a week. After serving in Korea and Japan, he was discharged in 1953 as a staff sergeant, returned home and married his first wife Julia, an artist and illustrator.

== Becoming an artist ==
Watson enrolled at Temple University's Tyler School of Art in 1954 and later transferred to the Pennsylvania Museum and School of Industrial Art (which became the Philadelphia College of Art and currently the University of the Arts), from which he graduated in June 1960 with a diploma in illustration. At the time, he was represented in a member show of the Philadelphia Watercolor Club – which he joined in 1958 - at the Philadelphia Art Alliance. A few months earlier, he had participated in the annual art show of the Pyramid Club. He also had illustrated several books and exhibited in national watercolor shows.

As a sophomore at the museum school in 1959, his watercolor won first prize in the Clothesline Exhibit at Rittenhouse Square, now the Rittenhouse Square Fine Art Show, the oldest in the country.

During the 1960s, Watson was hired at advertising agencies and greeting-card companies. He told one reporter that he was proud to have been the first person of color hired by an advertising agency - he illustrated ads - in the city during the 1960s. He also worked for Gourmet magazine in New York for four years. He created a series of prints for a calendar for the Radio Corporation of America (RCA) in Camden that he acknowledged were not very good. He decided that from then on, he would only do the best he could.

Getting started as a young artist was not easy, Watson said. One gallery that later accepted his works would not look at them back then. He hung in there, he said, and developed his own unique style.

== His impressionistic style ==
Although born in Pottsville, Watson adopted Philadelphia as his home and called the city "kind of my first love". He never lost sight of his birth city and county, and painted their landmarks and neighborhoods. He painted Philadelphia and the region in rosy tones, whether he was using soft pastels or gritty earth colors to evoke a mood.

"I love the medium of watercolors more than any other, and I love the Impressionists," he said. "My paintings are more like the impressions I get when I look at these sights, the shapes and forms that come into my mind's eye. That is what all great art and literature does. After all, Shakespeare did not simply reproduce dialogue he had heard in people's conversations. He shaped them and put them in a context that left a deep impression on the educated reader. That is what I try to do."

Watson, nicknamed "Bud", created some of his landscapes from sketches but mostly from photos he took with his camera or from photos culled from the research he undertook. He was also a quick painter, able to produce works in minimal time. His paintings were cheerful, his figures – who "are just shapes and color," he explained – enjoying carefree idyllic lives in the city and suburbs blanketed in snow or bathed in light. He saw homeless people on the streets, he told a Chestnut Hill Local reporter in 1988, and was affected by their predicament but chose not to paint it. (He created paintings to benefit various nonprofit organizations that assisted people in need).

An African American with great-grandmothers who were an enslaved African, German, Dutch and Native American, Watson did not produce paintings that focused on ethnicity. He noted that artists should be judged on their work. "People who look at my work do not know what race I am," he said. "They make a judgment strictly on my work."

The images of Black people in his paintings were also shapes and colors. He drew them in their Philadelphia neighborhoods – their faces brown – in much the same way as he painted people in the Italian Market, Chinatown and other ethnic neighborhoods. But he was aware of his Black history. "I liked doing the landscape of the (Philadelphia) Art Museum," Watson said, "not only because it’s one of the finest museums in the world, but also because of Julian Abele, a Black architect who designed the Art Museum during the 1920s, although he gets very little credit."

Around 1954, Watson painted a portrait in gouache of the noted African-American singer Marian Anderson, her face superimposed above Philadelphia rowhouses in the background. She is shown "in her native urban context", stated the introduction in the 2015 catalog for Woodmere Art Museum's We Speak: Black Artists in Philadelphia, 1920s–1970s.

Watson painted for commercial reasons: He wanted to sell his art. Corporations and newspapers commissioned him to create works, and hung his paintings and prints on their walls. "Sometimes you have to paint for other people," he said, noting that he also painted because he enjoyed it.

== White House connections ==
Watson was introduced to Presidents Jimmy Carter and Bill Clinton through his friend and mentor Set Momjian, a U.S. ambassador under Carter and art collector who purchased and commissioned works by Watson.

In the 1970s in the Carter White House, Watson was artist-in-residence, meaning he was "the preferred artist," he said. He was commissioned by Carter to illustrate a book on the 1976 campaign, and one year, he contributed to the design of the Carters’ greeting card. Carter gifted a print of one of Watson's paintings to VIPs around the world in 1995. Momjian commissioned Watson to create a painting of the 1977 inaugural parade, and Carter was given a limited-edition print of the painting.

In 1994, he was commissioned by Clinton's staff to create a watercolor as a gift to Philippine President Fidel V. Ramos, who had been a cadet at West Point. They needed the painting in three days. Watson dropped by the Print and Picture Collection at the Philadelphia Free Library to look at old photos of the military academy. He painted its clock tower with cadets marching in front of it. The Philippine president wept when he saw it, Watson told a Philadelphia Inquirer reporter in 1995, because it was the spot where he always met his wife.

Watson also produced paintings for Vice President Walter Mondale, singer Perry Como, former NBA coach Jack Ramsay and former Eagles player Tom Brookshier. "I take these commissions as being fun," Watson said of the gratis gifts. "It always has to be fun. I try not to be overwhelmed by anything that I do, because that’s not important. What you are leaving in this world, that’s what’s important."

== Exhibitions ==
Watson exhibited his paintings, participated in award programs and was a fixture with the Rittenhouse Square Art Show for several decades, including chairman of its annual competition in 1989. In 1988, the organization awarded a watercolor prize in his name.

He also participated in shows by the Pyramid Club, a social organization of Black professional men that held an annual art exhibit starting in 1941. He was joined in its 1960 show by Benjamin Britt, Reba Dickerson-Hill, Robert Jefferson, Samuel J. Brown Jr. and Dox Thrash. Watson's father had been a member of the club. In 1962, Watson, director of George Beach Studios, a Black-owned commercial art company, exhibited at the Little Gallery in Philadelphia as part of the Philadelphia Arts Festival.

In 1968, he exhibited in the first of a series of shows at Cheyney State College (now university) with an aim to broaden the scope of the school's 1,900 students. He exhibited often at Newman Galleries starting in the 1960s. He was one of three artists in a show in 1966, and a Philadelphia Inquirer reviewer noted that his "picturesque transcriptions of Philadelphia life convey the bustle of city streets in realistic watercolors. They are agreeably fresh and rewarding in best examples, although sometimes Watson lets himself be overwhelmed by masses of detail." He also was featured in a solo show at the gallery that year.

In 1967, he participated in "Black Projection '67" at the Southwest-Belmont Branch of the YWCA whose aim was to honor Black artists. Others represented included Benjamin Britt, Reba Dickerson-Hill and Humbert Howard. Watson was featured in a major exhibition of Black artists from across the country titled Afro American Artists, 1800–1969. It was mounted by the Philadelphia School District and the Philadelphia Civic Center Museum. At La Salle University's Black Student Union in 1969, he joined Britt, Howard, Barbara Bullock, Paul Keene and Louis B. Sloan in an African American Arts Festival featuring 28 artists.

Also in 1969, Watson's watercolors, which included urban street scenes, were shown at the Philadelphia Art Alliance. He also participated in a member show of the Philadelphia Watercolor Club at the alliance in 1963. In 1974, he participated in an exhibit at the Ridgeway Recreation Center titled Old Way in New World, along with Roland Ayers, Benjamin Britt, James Brantley and Walter Edmonds.

At the Philadelphia Free Library in 1988, Watson was featured in an exhibit titled The Pride, the Prejudice, which explored how Blacks had been portrayed in various media over three centuries. The works were from the Charles L. Blockson Afro-American Collection at Temple University and the Print and Picture Department at the Free Library of Philadelphia. Others represented included Dox Thrash, Samuel J. Brown Jr., Varnette Honeywood, Cal Massey, Barbara Bullock and Louise Clement-Hoff. It was curated by Blockson and artist Frank Stephens, graphics manager at the library.

Stephens curated another exhibit of prints of Black artists in the library's collection in 1992, and Watson was represented, as well as Roland Ayers, Benjamin Britt, Robert Jefferson, Columbus P. Knox, Tom McKinney, Cal Massey, Ellen Powell Tiberino, Joseph Holston and Sam Byrd.

In the 1997 exhibit Religion Through Brown Eyes, Watson was joined by Cal Massey, Barbara Bullock, Paul Keene, Benny Andrews, Charles Searles and Columbus P. Knox. The show, sponsored by the Minority Arts Resource Council, was mounted at the William J. Green Federal Building in Philadelphia. Watson's work was shown in a regional show of members of Allied Artists in America in 1980. Sponsored by Bucks County Council on the Arts, the exhibit included Ranulph Bye, Jack Bookbinder and E. Fenno Hoffman.

Watson exhibited in a number of solo shows at Hahn Gallery, Newman Galleries and the Carol Schwartz Gallery, which represented him for 20 years, in Philadelphia.

In 2015, he was in a major exhibit of artists mounted by Woodmere Art Museum titled We Speak: Black Artists in Philadelphia, 1920s–1970s. The show included more than 70 works by many of the area's most noted artists.

== His commissions ==
Watson produced murals for the Archdiocese of Philadelphia, paintings for large corporations and local newspapers, calendars for the city of Philadelphia and greeting cards for local hotels.

From 1962 to 1966, Watson painted watercolors for the Philadelphia Inquirer for a series depicting city and regional scenes titled "The World We Live In" that were reproduced in the newspaper. The first was a pictorial tour of the city, with paintings of Chinatown, Independence Hall, the Swann Memorial Fountain in Logan Square, Reading Terminal Market, and 56th and Market Streets. A commercial artist during the week, according to the accompanying text, he spent weekends walking the streets of the city painting scenes that "strike his fancy." He made his own watercolor paints, and spent two to three hours creating the works, according to the statement.

He also created paintings of old city buildings as they stood among new development, shipping activity at the Delaware River port and lighthouses off Delaware Bay in Pennsylvania, New Jersey and Delaware.

In the 1990s, he created wintry scenes of Philadelphia landmarks for greeting cards for sale to benefit the nonprofit Philadelphia Committee to End Homelessness, of which he was a board member. He annually designed holiday cards for the Easter Seal Society to raise money for rehabilitation, and often visited the Easter Seal-Fuhrman Clinic School and Rehabilitation Center. His 1970 card depicted a child walking with crutches in Elfreth Alley. He created artwork in 2007 to benefit the National Multiple Sclerosis Society. He also designed a series of postcards to commemorate the Bicentennial in 1976.

== As a teacher ==
Watson challenged his students to not just look but to "see". His classes were usually full, and he offered advice freely. He taught in schools, and held watercolor workshops locally, across the country and abroad.

His stint as a teacher reached back to when he was a student at Penn State. In the summer of 1949, he headed to Camp Sun Mountain in Pennsylvania to be art director.

Locally, he taught at the Woodmere Art Museum for 20 years. He taught graphics and illustration at the Hussian School of Art in the 1960s, Abington Art Center, the Philadelphia College of Art, the Oreland Art Center, the old Howard Pyle Art School (the Brandywine School in Wilmington, DE) and at various galleries. At one of his classes at Abington, he met his second wife, Irene.

He also taught watercolor in classes at the Jersey shore and Cape Cod in New England. Abroad, he conducted workshops in Canada, Austria, Switzerland, France, Scotland, Hawaii and Norway.

Watson served as a juror in juried art shows across the region.

He published two books of his works: Philadelphia Watercolors in 1971 and Old Philadelphia Impressions in 1975. He illustrated a children's book in 1969 by Victor Sharoff titled Garbage Can Cat and did drawings for The Proud Past.

== Affiliations ==
Watson was a member of the American Watercolor Society (joined in 1962), the Philadelphia Water Color Club (renamed the Philadelphia Water Color Society, and joined in 1959) and the Allied Artists of America. He was president of the Philadelphia club for 10 years and also served as its archivist.

he participated in the U.S. State Department Art in Embassies program, through which his paintings hung in Montevideo, Uruguay; La Paz, Bolivia; Bamako, Mali, and Kigali, Rwanda.

In September 1964, he helped form the Germantown Arts Association. The group held shows at Shelmerdine mansion, which it hoped to purchase to house its headquarters, art gallery and workshops for professional and advanced amateur artists. Watson was among artists in its first show, organized a few months before the group was formalized, along with Benton Spruance, Mildred Dillon and Jack Bookbinder. The association held its first major show at the mansion a month after becoming official. Watson headed the curatorial committee, inviting professional painters, sculptors, printmakers and photographers in the Philadelphia metropolitan area to submit work. The exhibit included a membership and fundraising drive. In early 1965, the group held a retrospective on pioneer photographer Berenice Abbott of New York, who had worked with Man Ray in Paris, France, in the 1920s. The group continued to hold art exhibits through 1965, including a display of prints and photographs, including Pablo Picasso’s and Alfred Stieglitz’s, on loan from the Philadelphia Museum of Art. By June 1965, the group faced eviction from the mansion and was finally evicted.

Watson was on the board of Philadelphia Volunteer Lawyers for the Arts, which provided legal and business services for culture groups. In 1973, he was appointed to a Pennsylvania committee to review the arts industry to help inform the state on grants to local organizations. In 1980, he was appointed by Pennsylvania Gov. Milton Shapp to the Pennsylvania Council on the Arts.

== Awards ==
In 1980, Watson was among 50 people named Distinguished Pennsylvanians in business, education, government sports and community affairs. In 2002, he was the first artist to be inducted into the Schuylkill County Council for the Arts’ Hall of Fame. He painted two works for the occasion.

== Death ==
Watson died in Glenside, Pennsylvania, on June 17, 2022, at the age of 93.

== Selected collections ==
- Woodmere Art Museum
- Pennsylvania Academy of the Fine Arts
- Drexel University
- Free Library of Philadelphia
- Whitman Branch, Free Library of Philadelphia
- Lewis Tanner Moore Collection

== Selected exhibitions ==
- Rosemont College, 1966
- Friends Neighborhood Guild Gallery, 1966
- Ebenezer Maxwell Mansion, 1968,
- La Salle University, 1969, 1977
- Marshall-Edelstein Gallery, Warwick Hotel, 1971
- Cultural Center of Ocean City (NJ), 1972
- Sandpiper Galerie, Stone Harbor, NJ, 1972
- Revsin Gallery, 1972
- Lee Cultural Center, 1972
- Philadelphia College of Art, 1973
- Gross McCleaf Gallery, 1975
- Gilbert Stuart Studio, 1976
- Eastern College, 1976
- Uchoraji Gallery/WEB DuBois House, University of Pennsylvania, 1978
- Gallery 306, 1977, 1979
- Studio Coleman Gallery, 1983
- Academy of Notre Dame de NAMUR, Villanova, PA, 1984
- Oreland Art Center, 1985
- Studio II, Spread Eagle Village, 1985
- Gloucester County College, 1985
- Temple University School of Law, 1986
- Temple University, Diamond Club, 1989
- Barn Studio Gallery, 1990
- De Virgilis Designs (North Wales, PA), 1992
- Wyncote Civic Association, 1994, 1995
- Levering Gallery, 1996
- Jewish Community Centers, Klein Branch, 1996
- Chestnut Hill Gallery, 2016
