= John T. Harris (artist) =

American artist

- Harris in the 1940s, photographed by John W. Mosley
- Born: 1908
- Died: 1972 (aged 63–64)
- Known for: Painter, printmaker, educator

John T. Harris (1908–1972) was an American artist and educator. He was born in Philadelphia. He attended the Philadelphia Museum School of Industrial Art and the Tyler School of Art and Architecture. He taught art at the Cheyney State Teachers College.

== Early life and education ==
Harris was born in Philadelphia in 1908. He received a Master's degree from the Museum School of Art and the Tyler School of Art.

== Career ==
Harris was a painter, printmaker, and instructor. His work was included in the 2015 exhibition We Speak: Black Artists in Philadelphia, 1920s–1970s at the Woodmere Art Museum.

His work is in the La Salle University Art Museum. His papers are in the Archives of American Art at the Smithsonian Institution.

Harris died in 1972.
