= John Mosley (disambiguation) =

John Mosley is an American football player and soldier

John Mosley may also refer to:

- John W. Mosley, photojournalist
- John Mosley (cyclist)
- John Mosley Turner, supercentenarian
