= Edward Ellis Hughes =

American artist

- Born: 1940; Philadelphia, Pennsylvania
- Died: 2017 (aged 76–77)
- Known for: Painter

Edward Ellis Hughes (1940-2017) was an American painter. He was born in Philadelphia in 1940. He attended the Pennsylvania Academy of the Fine Arts and the Cheyney University of Pennsylvania where he earned his Bachelor of Fine Arts degree.

His work has been described as abstract, containing symbols from black American and Haitian culture. His work was included in the 2015 exhibition We Speak: Black Artists in Philadelphia, 1920s–1970s at the Woodmere Art Museum.

His work is in the Philadelphia Museum of Art. He also created a ceramic tile installation for the 56th Street elevated subway station of the SEPTA.
