= Martina Johnson-Allen =

American artist

- Born: August 4, 1947 (age 78); Philadelphia, Pennsylvania
- Known for: Painter, sculptor, and printmaker, educator

Martina Johnson-Allen (born 1947) is an American artist and educator.

== Biography ==
Johnson-Allen was born in Philadelphia on August 4, 1947. She attended Pennsylvania State University and the University of the Arts. She taught art in Philadelphia Public Schools and had retired from the public school system. In 2006 the Brandywine Workshop and Archives printed an edition of her lithograph Another Realm, a copy of which is in the collection of the Philadelphia Museum of Art. Her work is also in the Petrucci Family Foundation Collection of African-American Art.

Johnson-Allen's mixed media sculpture "The Seven Crones" was included in the African American Museum in Philadelphia's 2002 exhibit "4 Artists of Distinction" and is now in their permanent collection.

Johnson-Allen's work was included in the 2015 exhibition We Speak: Black Artists in Philadelphia, 1920s-1970s at the Woodmere Art Museum. In 2010, Sande Webster Gallery featured her works in a group show of women artists titled "Women's Work: A Group Show" that included artists Martina Johnson-Allen, Maya Freelon, Betsy Casanas, Nannette Acker Clark, Alice Oh, Heather Pieters, Doris Nogueira-Rogers, Marta Sanchez and Kathleen Spicer.
