= Ida E. Jones (painter) =

African American folk painter

Ida Ella Ruth Jones
- Born: February 4, 1874; Chatham, Pennsylvania
- Died: January 31, 1959 (aged 84)
- Known for: Painter

Ida Ella Ruth Jones (February 4, 1874 – January 31, 1959) was an African American folk painter. Jones completed over three hundred paintings in under fourteen years. Born in 1874, in the small town of Chatham Pennsylvania, Jones devoted most of her life to helping her family on the farm or creating a family of her own when she wasn’t painting or writing. Which happened to occupy most of her life as she began painting at the age of 72.

== Early life ==
Jones was born on February 4, 1874, in rural Chester County where she was the third daughter of ten children. Both her parents, Samuel and Louisa Ruth had previously been slaves and found their way in owning a small piece of land where they established their own family farm. Jones was known to keep her hands busy whether it be watching her siblings or gathering produce around said farm. Education was not as important to the Ruth family as domestic stability was. Nonetheless, all aspects of her early life were extremely forming to who Jones was becoming as an artist.

== Personal life ==
In 1893, Ida married William Oscar Jones when she was nineteen years old. Right after marriage they soon began starting their family, which resulted in them having a total of twelve children. When not busy caring for their family, the two parents devoted themselves to the Church of Christ where William became the leader of the church and Ida served as the congregation's “song leader.” After the death of her husband, Ida was known to write letters to Roberta Townsend where they discussed many things but mainly about her art and technique. Jones died on January 31, 1959. Before and after Ida’s death her daughter, Ida J. Williams, documented these letters and wrote extensively about her mother.

== Work ==
The minimal education received by Jones was overshadowed by her love of art. With only receiving a few lessons in the craft, Jones' developed most of her skills by scribbling in her sketchbook whenever she had the chance. These skills were put into practice consistently after the death of her husband in 1947.

Heavily inspired by her early life on the farm, most of her work conveys different motifs of the life that was around her; farm houses and landscapes, flowers and fields, fruits and animals, and so on. When Jones wasn’t painting the surroundings she became so used to she would create her own depictions of biblical scenes. All in all, these subjects coincided with childhood stories and experiences such as her family’s tumultuous relationship with slavery or the rise of new technologies in her rustic town and were typically painted on canvas with either oil or watercolor.

After being contacted by Horace Bond, historian, and president of Lincoln University, to discuss her family's notable part in the Underground Railroad, Jones’s finally received some recognition for her art. Bond established her first exhibit where she met historians Roberta and Walter Townsend. They were responsible for continuing to archive and exhibit Jones' work after her debut.

Jones' work was included in the 2015 exhibition We Speak: Black Artists in Philadelphia, 1920s-1970s at the Woodmere Art Museum.
