= Ellen Powell Tiberino =

American painter

- Born: 1937
- Died: February 28, 1992 (aged 54–55); Philadelphia, Pennsylvania, United States
- Education: Pennsylvania Academy of the Fine Arts
- Occupation: Artist
- Spouse: Joseph Tiberino
- Children: Raphael Tiberino, Ellen Tiberino, Gabriel Tiberino, Leonardo Tiberino
- Awards: Cresson Traveling Scholarship, Pennsylvania Academy of the Fine Arts, 1959

Ellen Powell Tiberino (1937–1992) was an African American visual artist, who was figurative and expressionist in her pastels, oils, pencil drawings and sculptures. Her works were infused with the experiences and history of Black people, women in particular, whom she most often painted in dark and haunting hues. She was a prolific artist, working against time as she battled cancer for the last 14 years of her life.

== Early life and education ==
Ellen Powell was born in Philadelphia in 1937 to William and Queenie Powell, sharecroppers who had moved to Philadelphia from Cape Charles, Virginia, just weeks before she was born. Her father brought his family north seeking better opportunities for his children. "We were looking for the same things as the European immigrants," Ellen said in a 1989 interview. Her father was a truckman for the railroad and her mother was a homemaker. She was the third of seven children who grew up in the Mantua section of West Philadelphia.

As a child, she drew pictures of family and friends. She also listened closely to tales of her family from such people as her great-aunt Lita who inspired her portraits and line drawings. Her parents told her that she could accomplish anything that she wanted. They were Baptists, but Ellen converted to Catholicism around age 13.

Her talent for art was acknowledged in junior and senior high school. At Sulzberger Junior High, she received a "small" check as an award for an original poster in a health contest. While a senior at Overbrook High in 1955, she returned to Sulzberger to speak to students about training courses available in senior high school. She brought along some of her paintings and collages, which featured fabric and materials on watercolor. She graduated from Overbrook in 1956. As a teenager, she worked as a nurse's aide at Wills Eye Hospital.

Tiberino received a City of Philadelphia scholarship to attend the Pennsylvania Academy of the Fine Arts (PAFA) and arrived there in 1956. She received honors for her work but faced resistance from some faculty and staffers, she said in a 1988 interview. They resented her awards "or (her) just being there. But I don't like to put things on the basis of color, or sex. People who have problems like that – they stem from their own insecurity," she said. Tiberino had been preceded at PAFA by a handful of Black students in the 20th century - Laura Wheeler Waring, Morris Blackburn, Raymond Saunders and Louis B. Sloan. In the mid-19th century, John Henry Smythe (Smyth) was the first Black student to be admitted to the academy.

Artist Moe Brooker, also a PAFA graduate, recalled her presence at the academy. He was "dazzled" by her, he said in the catalog for Woodmere Art Museum's 2015 exhibit "We Speak: Black Artists in Philadelphia, 1920s-1970s." "When she walked down the hall, everyone stopped! ... She was the first student of color I remember when I was at PAFA because I was a couple years behind her."

Tiberino was awarded the prestigious Cresson Traveling Scholarship in 1959 and traveled through Europe. She was 19 years old and in her third year at PAFA. She told the Philadelphia Tribune newspaper that she planned to go to Spain; France; Naples, Italy, and other countries. She was the second African American woman to win the Cresson; the other was Laura Wheeler Waring (1914). Louis B. Sloan and Raymond Saunders also had been winners.

While at PAFA, Tiberino studied under Franklin C. Watkins, Hobson Pittman and Walter Stuempfig. She graduated in 1961 and moved to New York. She remained in that city for six years, returning to Philadelphia to marry Joseph Tiberino, whom she had met at a going-away party for her NY move back in 1961. He was a white Italian-American artist born in Philadelphia who was attending the Philadelphia College of Art. They got married in 1967.

Some of her friends tried to talk her out of marrying him, telling her that it would ruin her art and impede her growth. It enhanced her growth, she said in a 1989 interview, because he was supportive of her work. His being of another race didn't bother her, she said, noting that the color of his skin was the least important thing to her. Compatibility was more significant, she said.

Tiberino named two of her sons after her favorite 15th-century Italian Renaissance painters: Raphael and Leonardo. Joseph named their daughter after Ellen. The couple had a third son, Gabriel.

== Her art ==
Tiberino was one of Philadelphia's most notable artists, a "major talent with a paintbrush or a pencil", wrote a Philadelphia Inquirer art critic in 1999. Her works were not delicate, the critic noted, but were infused with empathy and tenderness. Another critic described her art as tumultuous and staccato, with menacing and shadowy figures. It was purposefully meant to disturb, the critic stated.

She was a figurative, stylized expressionistic artist who produced oils, pastels, pencil drawings and bas-relief sculptures. She also produced prints of some of her works. Among her subjects were young girls becoming aware of their bodies, Black women in pregnancy and motherhood, neighborhood people expressing joy and sorrow, African American life and strife, and her Catholic faith. She chose her subjects from her experiences - stories she heard, photographs she saw and people she observed. Some were people on West Philadelphia street corners, inside New York speakeasies, participating in Sunday High Mass and Baptist funerals.

Her husband Joseph noted that her earliest paintings were dark in tone, so much so that her subjects were barely distinguishable. She painted what she felt and observed, she once said, not what others wanted her to portray. She created a painting titled "The Lynching" because she felt a need to do it, she told an interviewer. She didn't expect anyone to buy it, she added, but it sold to a private collector. It is now in the collection of the Museum of African American Art in Tampa, FL.

"When I am asked where I get my inspiration, I say it's all my life, my friends, everything I've seen and known. And I want to make it all come together and make sense and make people see. There's a feeling of joy that comes with it. I don't think enough credit is given to the real things in life, what I base my work on. Many people want only beauty around them, and I record life." ..." I've never sold myself short. I paint to please no one but myself, and I have done more meaningful work because of it. I paint life, and life is not always beautiful."

In 1978, when she was 40 years old and the mother of three children, Tiberino was diagnosed with cancer. She was told that she had six to 12 months to live. For the next 14 years, cancer was a presence in her life. She battled it while she painted, sometimes from her bed at home and in the hospital. Her first painting after the diagnosis was "The Operation," c. 1980, a busy scene of doctors and nurses surrounding a sick patient as Death awaits alongside them.

Her illness had a profound effect on her life and her work. She wrote in a profile in a catalog for October Gallery: "My art and life are intertwined. I cannot divorce Ellen Powell Tiberino the artist from Ellen Powell Tiberino the wife, mother and friend. My work is my way of seeing everything. I relate best through my art. It is both a blessing and a curse. Illness is so much a part of my life with which I have had to come to terms. Respect for time has become so important to me. So many of my drawings (paintings) are in my head, and I worry that I can't get them all done. There is an urgency now that I didn't feel before. Before I finish one piece, I am ready to start another. My creative impulse continues to grow, and I know my work is better."

She made the pencil drawing "Farewell to Ethiopia" because she knew that she would never get a chance to visit the African country. For several years, Tiberino signed her works "Ellen Tiberino," but soon began including "Powell" in deference to her father and mother, she told an interviewer. Later, she created a pencil drawing of her mother titled "Queenie."

== The MOVE sculpture ==
Tiberino's most controversial work was a collaboration with Joseph of a seven-foot relief sculpture depicting their interpretation of the MOVE bombing in 1985, which led to the deaths of five children & six adults in Philadelphia. The sculpture—titled "The MOVE Confrontation," created in 1986—depicted people engulfed in flames, Mayor W. Wilson Goode, a Death mask and horrified spectators. It was hung in the Temple University School of Law building as a Black History Month exhibit. It created controversy in the city and produced headlines across the country.

She said that they created the piece to express the pain they felt at watching the bombing of the MOVE compound. She speculated that it caused an uproar because Goode was still in office at the time. "I'm not a politician; I'm an artist. I must record what I see," she told an interviewer a few years later.

Tiberino also created paintings with brilliant colors and softer themes. These included "Perfect Day" with a huge bouquet of flowers; "Mother and Child," showing the intimacy of motherhood; "Heart of the Day" with soft purples and oranges, and animals. "The Cock Crows (1988) " was included in the 2022 exhibit "Don't Feed the Art: Woodmere's Animal Menagerie" at the Woodmere Art Museum.

== Collaborations with artist-husband Joseph Tiberino ==
In addition to the MOVE sculpture, Tiberino collaborated and exhibited often with her husband Joseph. He specialized in murals and portraits. They were considered the "Frida Kahlo and Diego Rivera" of West Philadelphia.

They created an artistic compound of houses and structures in Powelton Village in West Philadelphia where they decorated the walls with paintings, murals, relief sculptures and other artwork. They also decorated their living space, patio, gardens and yards with art and sculptures. Begun in the early 1980s, it was a haven and meeting spot for both aspiring and seasoned artists, as well as friends. They held gallery openings on "Second Friday" and gallery walks. A devout Catholic, Tiberino set up a chapel to receive Holy Communion from the parish priest. She told an interviewer in 1989 that she got her courage from her faith.

Even before the compound, Tiberino and Joseph had converted a drugstore in Powelton Village called "The Building" for workshops led by artists and for group shows. Over the years, she taught art classes in the community, at her son Raphael's school, at her home on Saturdays and at one point, at her studio.

In 1991, she exhibited with Joseph, their son Raphael and four other artists at Galerie Nadeau as members of the Rambla Group, which also included Earl Wilkie. It was a group of artists who gathered for support and to share techniques.

== Ellen Powell Tiberino Memorial Museum of Contemporary American Art ==
Tiberino died on February 28, 1992. Joseph opened the Ellen Powell Tiberino Memorial Museum of Contemporary American Art in her honor in 1999, inspired after he visited the Barnes Museum then in Merion, PA. It was a dream of his and her friends, including artist Laura Williams Chassot. The museum is part of the compound in Powelton Village. It hosts exhibits and offers a space for friends, artists and neighbors to drop in to discuss their art or to just hang out.

== Early and prominent exhibitions ==
While still at the academy, Tiberino exhibited at small venues and homes in the Philadelphia area. In 1960, the Citizens Service Committee sponsored an exhibit at a home to show off the city's young Black artists and their contributions to the art world. She was joined by artist/illustrator Robert Jefferson, Arthur Morgan, Gene Reynolds, Bernard Harmon, Eugene Solomon, Irma Wilson, Sandy Moon, Alonzo Perrin, Robert Forrest and sculptor Tony Barber.

When she moved to New York in 1961, she painted and exhibited in the city. She participated in a show at the Lynn Kottler Gallery in 1963 that featured oil paintings titled "Two Figures" and "Poochie," which "are attracting much comment", the New York Amsterdam News reported.

She had a solo show in Goldstein Gallery in Philadelphia in 1963 where she exhibited 16 oils and 19 drawings. Three years later, she was among young Black artists and students chosen to exhibit at William Penn Memorial Museum in Harrisburg by the mayor's Committee on Human Relations. Others included Moe Brooker, Barbara Bullock, Walter Edmonds, Charles Pridgen, Percy Ricks, Leroy Johnson, John Simpson, Maurice Thompkins, Gwendolyn Joyce Daniels and Tina Lloyd King.

In 1963, she was selected to exhibit in PAFA's Annual Exhibition of Painting and Sculpturing, joining Louis B. Sloan and Raymond Saunders.

In 1969, Tiberino was among 100 Black artists from across the country to participate in the exhibit "Afro-American Artists 1800-1969" sponsored by the School District of Philadelphia and the Philadelphia Civic Center Museum. It included works by some of the country's top artists, including Horace Pippin, Nancy Elizabeth Prophet, Jacob Lawrence, Benny Andrews, Roland Ayers, Romare Bearden, Avel de Knight, Barkley Hendricks, Paul Keene, Raymond Saunders, Louis B. Sloan, Ed Wilson, Henry Ossawa Tanner and Joshua Johnson.

That same year, she exhibited in Lincoln University's first Black Arts Festival, a major exhibit of Black artists in the Philadelphia metropolitan area. The show included works by Sam Gilliam, Romare Bearden, James Gadson, John Cook, John Wade, John Simpson, Walter Edmonds, Moe Brooker, Simmie L. Knox and Percy Ricks.

In 1971, she participated in Percy Rick's "Afro American Images 1971" show at the State Armory in Wilmington, DE. The show by Rick's Aesthetic Dynamics Inc. featured 75 artists from New York to Washington, D.C., with 150 pieces of artwork. The artists included Randall Craig, an organizer of the 1969 exhibition in Philadelphia; Lois Mailou Jones, James L. Wells, Charles W. White, Norman Lewis, Samella Lewis and Edward Loper Sr. The exhibit was re-created in 2021 at the Delaware Art Museum in partnership with Aesthetic Dynamics.

In 1977, Tiberino was the first artist to hold a solo exhibition at the Afro-American Historical and Cultural Museum, showing more than 40 paintings and drawings. The museum described her work as "infused with great emotion and passion. Her paintings and drawings with their soft, dark blustery lines strike the viewer with an immediate sense of the subject's physical and spiritual integrity."

In 1986, her works were in the exhibition "U.S. Art Census '86: Contemporary African-American Artists" at the Pennsylvania Academy of the Fine Arts. The show accompanied a meeting of the National Conference of Artists in Philadelphia. Other artists featured were Moe Brooker, Walter Edmonds, James Dupree, Nanette Carter, Deryl Daniel Mackie and Charles Searles.

In 1992, she was represented in an exhibit of 19th and 20^{th-}century African American artists at the Philadelphia Museum of Art, which featured works from its collection and on loan. Included was her portrait of Sister Geneva, a Black missionary who worked in Tanzania. Titled "Works by African Americans," the museum exhibit also included Jacob Lawrence, Romare Bearden, Henry Ossawa Tanner, Paul Keene, Howardena Pindell, Betty Saar, Carrie Mae Weems, Bill Traylor, William Hawkins, William Edmondson, Rev. William Gayles, Ned Cheadham and Furman Humphrey.

A few weeks before she died on February 28, 1992, her works were on exhibit in five spaces: October Gallery, Lucien Crump Art Gallery, Heritage Art Gallery, Hahn Gallery and the Free Library of Philadelphia. The Free Library exhibit featured prints by Delaware Valley Black artists from its collection, including Dox Thrash, Claude Clark, Samuel J. Brown Jr., Raymond Steth, Roland Ayers, Benjamin Britt, Reba Dickerson Hill, Tom McKinney, Columbus Knox, Dressler Smith, Cal Massey, Howard N. Watson, Joseph Holston and Sam Byrd.

== Posthumous exhibitions ==
Since her death, Tiberino's works have been exhibited in several solo and group shows. In 2000, the Philadelphia Museum of Art held a group show of prints and drawings by African Americans. Two of her works, which had never been exhibited, were shown: "Ethiopian Dancer" and "Farewell to Uncle Cliff." Other artists represented included Samuel J. Brown Jr., Charles Burwell, Quentin Morris, Howardena Pindell, Charles Searles, Humbert Howard, Raymond Steth and Dox Thrash.

Tiberino's works were presented in two exhibits encompassing her family. In 2007, Sande Webster Gallery produced "The Tiberino Family: A Legacy of Art," which included Joseph, and children, Raphael, Ellen and Gabriel. In 2013, the African American Museum in Philadelphia told the story of the family and its connection to the city and the Black community. The show, titled "The Unflinching Eye: Works of the Tiberino Family Circle," was a 50-year retrospective of a family that has been called the "West Philly Wyeths."

In 2015, she was represented in the Woodmere Art Museum's "We Speak: Black Artists in Philadelphia 1920s to 1970s." In 2021, she was included in the re-staging of Percy Ricks' exhibit "Afro-American Images 1971" at the Delaware Art Museum.

== Selected exhibitions ==
- Studio 13, 1962
- Lynn Kottler Gallery (NY), 1963
- Pennsylvania Academy of the Fine Arts, 1963, 1986
- Goldstein Gallery, 1964
- William Penn Memorial Museum (Harrisburg, PA), 1966
- Philadelphia Museum of Art, 1992, 2000
- Lincoln University, 1969
- Philadelphia Civic Center Museum, 1969
- Gallery 252, 1970
- State Armory (Wilmington, DE), 1971
- Custom Frame Shop and Gallery, 1972, 1973,1982
- Acts of Arts Gallery (NY), 1973
- Ile-Ife Museum of Afro-American culture, 1975, 1981
- African American Museum in Philadelphia, 1977, 2004
- Thompson Park Visitors Center (NJ), 1976
- Philomathean Society Art Gallery, University of Pennsylvania, 1978
- Balch Institute for Ethnic Studies, 1980
- Alfred O. Deshong Museum (Widener University), 1981
- Painted Bride Art Center, 1983
- Off The Wall Gallery, 1985
- Temple University School of Law, 1986
- Upstairs Gallery at Bacchanal, 1985, 1987, 1989
- Free Library of Philadelphia, 1988, 1992
- Uptown Visual Arts Complex, 1988
- Uptown Theater, 1989
- 623 Gallery at Try Arts, 1990
- Hahn Gallery, 1991, 1992
- October Gallery, 1990, 1991, 1992
- Woodmere Art Museum, 2009, 2015, 2017, 2022
- Trenton City Museum at Ellarslie (NJ), 2015
- Twenty Two Gallery, 2018
- Schomburg Center for Research in Black Culture (NY), 2019
- Delaware Art Museum, 2021

== Selected collections ==
- Bennett College, Greensboro, NC
- Cheyney University
- Delaware Art Museum
- Free Library of Philadelphia
- Museum of African American Art (Tampa, FL)
- Philadelphia Museum of Art
- Schomburg Center for Research in Black Culture
