= James Atkins (artist) =

American artist

- Born: 1941 (age 84–85)
- Known for: Painting

James Atkins (born 1941) is an American artist known for his paintings of Philadelphia. Mainly self-taught, Atkins attended art classes at Samuel S. Fleisher Art Memorial art school in South Philadelphia.

Atkins' work was included in the 2011 exhibition The Chemistry of Color: The Sorgenti Collection of Contemporary African-American Art at the Hudson River Museum. His work was also included in the 2015 exhibition We Speak: Black Artists in Philadelphia, 1920s–1970s at the Woodmere Art Museum.

His work is in the Pennsylvania Academy of the Fine Arts.
