= Donald Camp =

African American photographer

Donald E. Camp
- Born: 1940 (age 85–86); Meadville, Pennsylvania
- Occupations: Photographer and educator

Donald E. Camp (born 1940 in Meadville, Pennsylvania) is an American artist, photographer, and professor emeritus of photography at Ursinus College in Collegeville, Pennsylvania. Camp holds both a Bachelor of Fine Arts and a Master of Fine Arts from Tyler School of Art in Philadelphia. Camp is notable for his portraits that explore the dignity and nobility that can be found in the human face, particularly those of African American men. Camp's unique printing methods are based on early 19th Century non-silver photographic processes.

Early in his career Camp worked as a photojournalist for the Philadelphia Evening Bulletin and the Sunday Bulletin. He was a founding member of the Philadelphia Association of Black Journalists (PABJ).

In 1990 Camp began his photographic series Dust Shaped Hearts, large photographic prints created with raw earth pigment and casein. The portrait series began with images of Black men and has expanded to include women and other races.

In 1995 Camp was the recipient of a Guggenheim Fellowship.

His work has been collected by the Delaware Art Museum, the Petrucci Family Foundation Collection of African American-Art, The Philip and Muriel Berman Museum of Art, and the Pennsylvania Academy of Fine Arts. Donald Camp currently lives and works in Philadelphia.

Camp's work was featured in the 2015 exhibition We Speak: Black Artists in Philadelphia, 1920s-1970s at the Woodmere Art Museum.
