= Roland Ayers =

African American artist

- Born: July 2, 1932; Philadelphia
- Died: May 18, 2014 (aged 81); Philadelphia
- Known for: Painting

Roland Ayers (1932–2014) was an African American watercolorist and printmaker. He is better known for his intricate drawings – black-ink figures of humans and nature intertwined in a dream-like state against a neutral backdrop. A poet and lover of jazz and books, he expressed his poetry through images rather than words, he often noted, and considered his artwork to be poetry.

== Early life and education ==
Ayers was born July 2, 1932, in Philadelphia, an only child who at age four drew pictures on the inside blank pages of his parents’ books. Alice and Lorenzo Ayers gave their son some paper and other materials, and he'd sit for hours and draw. He drew war planes and jets, and copied the comics. His father, Ayers said in a 1978 exhibition catalog, showed him the beauty of words and inspired his interest in poetry.

In 1944, when he was 11 years old, he was singled out in a newspaper article as one of the Hill Elementary School students whose works were included in the first annual art exhibit at the Rittenhouse Street YMCA in Philadelphia.

He graduated from Germantown High School, joined the Army and spent two years in Germany as a cook. Afterward, he enrolled at the Philadelphia College of Art (now the University of the Arts), where he produced pen-and-ink drawings, collages, gouaches and watercolors. He graduated in 1954. He worked at the Philadelphia Recreation Department as a playground supervisor and sometimes designed for the department. He occasionally sold some of his works but could not entirely make a living at it.

== Artistic philosophy ==
Ayers described himself to one writer as an artist who dealt with “the reality of dreams.” His pen-and-ink works, in particular, have been described as “magically surreal,” mystical and existential. The images include urban landscapes, people, African sculptures and nature. “Nature's sounds, bodies moving, trees swaying in the wind, the sound of the sea. These are the things I want to make people aware of as they look at my work,” he said. While his pen-and-ink figures exist in the unreal world of dreams, his paintings are more figurative.

During the mid-1960s, Ayers found his way to Europe, traveling to Holland and Greece. As a Black artist, he felt unappreciated in the United States and found acceptance in Europe.

In 1966 while in Greece, he had a mystical experience that caused him to realize the connectedness of humans and nature. “All is oneness, a blade of grass, you and I, shoes, and ice cream.” That revelation spurred him to focus on his drawings rather than watercolors (a medium he did not fully return to until 1972). The experience was a form of meditation and Ayers became a follower of self-awareness teacher Jiddhu Krishnamurti.

Several of Ayers’ pen-and-ink works are in the Bibliothèque Royale de Belique (Royal Museum of Belgium): “May Queen (1971),” “Man-Child (1970),” “Dancing Woman and Charms (1971),” “Full Moon Time (1971)” and “Song(1971).”

In 1972, he visited West Africa, where he deepened his connection to his African heritage, which had been fueled by the 1960s Black power movement.

== Artistic career ==
In 1960, Ayers opened an art gallery called Waverly Gallery and Workshop in Philadelphia with two other Black artists. At the time, he was also doing some sculpting. His first juried competition was the Philadelphia Art Alliance's “Young Water Colorists” show in 1958. In 1963, he received a "Best of the Year" award from the alliance.

Ayers was a regular at galleries owned by Socrates Perakis in 1963. He had a one-man show at the Towne Gallery in March. In April and June, he was still exhibiting at Towne - offering the paintings "On Sunny Fields" and "The Colony" for sale in April. Ayers was identified as one of 16 members of the gallery, whose name was eventually changed to the Socrates Perakis Gallery. He was back at Towne later that year.

He showed watercolors and drawings at the Socrates Perakis Gallery again in the summer and fall of 1968. He created a poster for the fall show. A year later, he was included in a premier exhibition of Black artists – "a regionally major museum event," as one local newspaper writer stated. It was sponsored by the Philadelphia Civic Center Museum and the School District of Philadelphia. Titled "Afro-American Artists 1800-1969," the show featured 250 works by old and new artists from across the country. Ayers was one of three dozen local artists represented, including Ellen Powell Tiberino.

The Philadelphia Museum of Art included Ayers' watercolors in its Art Sales Rental Gallery in 1969, sponsored by the museum's Women's Committee. The works were consigned by local galleries. In 1971, he exhibited at the Carnegie Institute alongside artists Paul Keene and Bob Thompson.

In 1971, his works "Atlantis Rising II (1969)" and "The Creation (1970)" were shown in a controversial exhibit of Black artists at the Whitney Museum of American Art in New York. Titled "Contemporary Black Artists in America," the show was boycotted by a coalition of artists who had initiated the idea for the exhibit, along with others who pulled out. Coalition members complained that they were left out of the selection of artists for the show.

The aim of "Blackness USA-1973" at the New York Cultural Center was to show off 43 of the country's most talented Black artists, and Ayers was among them. A newspaper article noted his contributions: the drawings "Spring" and "Home."

In 1973, Ayers donated artwork for a worthy cause: the SICKLE-SALETHON sponsored by the Black Caucus of Eastern Airlines at the Studio Museum in Harlem. He was one of 24 artists and private collectors who donated works for this fundraising exhibit and sale.

In 1974, he was part of an exhibit at the Ridgeway Recreation Center in Philadelphia as an adjunct to a Nigerian folk-artists tour sponsored by the Smithsonian Institution. Titled "Nigeria – We Salute You ... Black Artists of Philadelphia," Ayers' works were hung aside other local Philadelphia artists, including Howard N. Watson, Benjamin Britt, James Brantley and Walter Edmonds.

Ayers also exhibited in homes, the most public of which was at the Pennsylvania governor's mansion in 1981. The show was mounted by the Afro-American Historical and Cultural Museum in Philadelphia as part of a statewide salute to artists in the state. The works were from the museum and private collections. Ayers' work titled "Americana II – Jazz" was from a private collection.

He participated in a group show at the Woodmere Art Gallery (later renamed the Woodmere Art Museum) in 1977 that included a retrospective of his pen-and-ink drawings over a 10-year period. "I think of the drawings as a ten-year journey of mind/body/soul that traveled over parts of three continents and explored many aspects of inner time and space," he said.

The Afro-American Historical and Cultural Museum featured Ayers' pen-and-ink works from 1972 to 1978 in a one-man show titled "Roland Ayers: A Personal Construct" in 1978. The Philadelphia Inquirer noted that his drawings had become very popular around the country and the Philadelphia Daily News stated that he was one of the country's most renowned artists. "Nature," as one writer noted of Ayers' works, "is always shown as part of the scheme of man." "His works are charged with fantastic imagery weaving in and out of foliage, bodies flowing into trees, faces appearing in leaves or other objects, houses floating in the sky like air ships," stated the curator of the Afro-American exhibit.

In 1978, he was among the artists chosen to participate in the Brandywine Workshop's "Visual Artists in Public Service." Artists were hired under the federal Comprehensive Employment and Training Act (CETA), a project modeled after the 1930s Federal Art Project that employed artists. In the yearlong project, artists provided classes and workshops, created murals and other public projects, and exhibited their works.

The year 1987 was a busy one for Ayers as a printmaker. He was commissioned by Moonstone Inc. of Philadelphia to create a pen-and-ink drawing and poster for its first annual Paul Robeson Festival in April. Ayers produced a drawing of Robeson in his many careers: as a football player at Rutgers University, as Othello on stage and as a peace and social activist. In 2021, the drawing was center stage at a one-man exhibit at the Woodmere. It was the impetus for a collaborative program between the museum and the West Philadelphia Cultural Alliance/Paul Robeson House & Museum in Philadelphia. The poster was printed at the Brandywine Workshop. Ayers was also represented in a 2015 group exhibition at the Woodmere.

He designed a commemorative poster titled "Originating," again printed at the Brandywine. The poster was distributed in June to recipients of the American Book Award, sponsored by the Before Columbus Foundation of Berkeley (California). Visitors attending a "Celebration of Black Writing" conference in Philadelphia in February were told that they would receive an autographed print designed by Ayers. At other times, he produced posters for groups, including the Joan Kerr Dance Company for its Winter-Spring 1980–81 season.

Ayers was manager of the Free Library of Philadelphia's used bookstore when he was included in a library exhibit titled "Prints of Black Artists of the Delaware Valley" in 1992. His Robeson print was among a collection uncovered by a curator at the library – some dating back to the Works Progress Administration's Depression-era Federal Art Project. He was back at the African American Museum in Philadelphia – under its new name – in 2001 for a group show titled "Affirmations: Objects and Movements That Make Us Feel." Its focus was on the spiritual power and high aspirations of Black people. Ayers was represented with the painting "Avenging Angel."

== Later years ==
In 1980, he was one of the organizers of the Philadelphia Chapter of the National Conference of Artists. The national organization was founded in 1959 in Atlanta to bring together Black artists.

Ayers was director of the Allens Lane Art Center in 1985 where he also taught classes. While there he held an exhibit of his works titled “The Elements of Design,” to demonstrate the use of line, color, form, space and texture. Also that year, Ayers lectured on “Image and the Artist” at the Chester County Art Association. He also taught at his alma mater, the Philadelphia College of Art. Around the 1990s, Ayers was creating collages.

In 1991, he became manager of the newly reopened Free Library of Philadelphia’s used bookstore. Ayers was forced to quit after developing Alzheimer's. He died of complications from Alzheimer's in 2014.

His work was featured in the 2015 exhibition We Speak: Black Artists in Philadelphia, 1920s-1970s at the Woodmere Art Museum.

== Collections ==
- Bibliothèque Royale de Belique (Royal Museum of Belgium)
- Concertgebouw de Doelen, Rotterdam The Netherlands
- Free Library of Philadelphia
- Philadelphia Museum of Art
- Woodmere Art Museum
- Free Library of Philadelphia, Print and Picture Collection

== Exhibitions ==
- Pennsylvania Academy of the Fine Arts, 1961, 1964, 1969
- Samuel S. Fleischer Art Memorial, 1960, 1961
- Philadelphia Art Alliance, 1958, 1963
- Towne Gallery, 1963
- Socrates Perakis Gallery, 1968
- Washington (DC) Gallery of Modern Art, 1968
- Philadelphia Museum of Art, 1969, 1971
- Philadelphia Civic Center Museum, 1969
- Ball State University, 1970
- Carnegie Institute, 1971
- Whitney Museum of American Art, 1971
- New York Cultural Center, 1973
- Studio Museum in Harlem, 1973
- Walnut Theatre Gallery, 1973
- Museum of Fine Arts, Boston, 1975
- Kyle Hammond’s Gallery 3 ½ and 4, 1975
- Painted Bride Art Center, 1976
- University of Pennsylvania Museum, Regional Show for the Second World Black and African Festival of Art and Culture, 1974
- Woodmere Art Museum, 1977, 2015, 2021
- Takers Café, Germantown, 1977
- Allens Lane Arts Center, 1985
- University City Arts League, 1987
- Free Library of Philadelphia, 1992
- African American Museum in Philadelphia, 1978, 2001

== Awards ==
- Best of Year Award (1963), Philadelphia Art Alliance
- Excellence in Printmaking (1959, 1960), Fleischer Art Memorial
- Henry O. Tanner Award, Best of Show (1974), Philadelphia Urban League Guild
