= The Fatal Wounding of Sir Philip Sidney =

Painting by Benjamin West

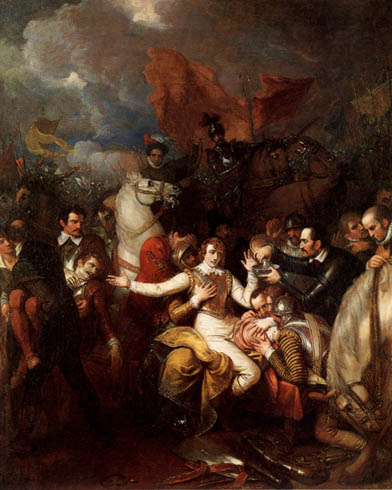
- Artist: Benjamin West
- Year: 1806
- Type: Oil on canvas, history painting
- Dimensions: 198.1 cm × 157.4 cm (78.0 in × 62.0 in)
- Location: Woodmere Art Museum, Philadelphia

The Fatal Wounding of Sir Philip Sidney is an 1806 history painting by the Anglo-American artist Benjamin West. It features a reimagining of the ultimately mortal wounding of the English writer Philip Sidney at the 1586 Battle of Zutphen during the Eighty Years' War. Sidney, a celebrated Elizabethan era poet, had volunteered with other Englishman to fight alongside the Dutch in their war against Spain. With Heroic stoicism, he is shown saying that a drink of water offered to him should be given to nearby man whose need was greater than his. Sidney subsequently died of his wounds in Arnhem and received a large public burial at Saint Paul's Cathedral.

The picture is part of a tradition of noble death scenes produced by West. The painting was commissioned by Alexander Davison, a military contactor during the Napoleonic Wars. Stylistically it was more in line with emerging Romanticism than the Neoclassicism with which the artist has become famous decades earlier. West included a self-portrait of himself on the far right of the picture. The painting is today in the collection of the Woodmere Art Museum in West's native Pennsylvania.

== Bibliography ==
- Murray, Christopher John. Encyclopedia of the Romantic Era, 1760-1850, Volume 2. Taylor & Francis, 2004.
- Schantz, Michael W. Celebrating Philadelphia's Artistic Legacy. Woodmere Art Museum, 2019.
