= James Brantley =

American artist

- Born: 1945 (age 80–81); Philadelphia, Pennsylvania, U.S.
- Known for: painter
- Awards: Hallgarten Prize; Louis Fine Purchase Award
- Website: www.stanekgallery.com/master-artist-james-brantley/

James Brantley (born 1945, Philadelphia, Pennsylvania, U.S.) is an American artist known for his painting.

== Biography ==
Brantley was born in 1945 in Philadelphia, Pennsylvania. He studied at the Pennsylvania Academy of Fine Arts, the Philadelphia College of Art, and the University of Pennsylvania.

His work is in the Petrucci Family Foundation Collection of African American Art, the Pennsylvania Academy of the Fine Arts, and the Philadelphia Museum of Art.

His work was included in the 2011 exhibition The Chemistry of Color: The Sorgenti Collection of Contemporary African-American Art at the Hudson River Museum and the 2015 exhibition We Speak: Black Artists in Philadelphia, 1920s-1970s at the Woodmere Art Museum.
