= John W. Mosley =

American photojournalist (1907–1969)

- self portrait
- Born: John W. Mosley; May 19, 1907; Lumberton, North Carolina
- Died: October 1, 1969 (aged 62); Reading, Pennsylvania
- Known for: Photography

John W. Mosley (May 19, 1907 – October 1, 1969) was a self-taught photojournalist who extensively documented the everyday activities of the African-American community in Philadelphia, Pennsylvania, for more than 30 years, a period including both World War II and the civil rights movement. His work was published widely in newspapers and magazines including The Philadelphia Tribune, The Pittsburgh Courier and Jet magazine.

Mosley has been called a "cultural warrior" for preserving a record of African-American life in Philadelphia and Pennsylvania, one which combats "negative stereotypes and false interpretations of African-American history and culture". More than 300,000 of Mosley's photographs are included in the Charles L. Blockson Afro-American Collection at Temple University. Exhibitions of his work have been shown at the Philadelphia International Airport and the Woodmere Art Museum.

== Early life ==
John W. Mosley was born in 1907 in Lumberton, North Carolina. His father was a Baptist minister and a barber. Mosley played football in high school. He began teaching himself photography with a simple box camera in the 1920s. He studied at Johnson C. Smith University in Charlotte, North Carolina.

In 1934, Mosley moved to Philadelphia as part of the Great Migration. There, he obtained a job as a professional photographer at Barksdale Photography Studio. He later had a darkroom and photographic studio at the Christian Street YMCA.

== Photography ==
External videos
- “A Million Faces: The photography of John W. Mosley”, Woodmere Art Museum

Mosley flourished in his career as a photographer from the 1930s to the 1960s. He was known to photograph as many as four events a day, seven days a week. He traveled around Philadelphia on public transit, carrying his cameras and other equipment.

Mosley shot in black and white film. He used a large-format Graflex Speed Graphic camera. and a medium-format Rollieflex.

Proud of his heritage, Mosley chose to portray the black community positively at family, social, and cultural events that were part of daily life. He photographed individuals and families at weddings, picnics, churches, segregated beaches, sporting events, concerts, galas, and civil rights protests. During a time of racism and segregation, he emphasized the achievements of black celebrities, athletes, and political leaders.

Among those he photographed were bandleader Duke Ellington, trumpeter Cootie Williams, basketball player Wilt Chamberlain, tennis player Ora Washington, Paul Leroy Robeson, Billy Eckstine, Billie Holiday, Martin Luther King Jr., Cecil B. Moore, Marian Anderson, Eleanor Roosevelt, and President Richard Nixon, to name only a few.

Locations he captured included Nixon's Grand Theatre at Broad Street and Montgomery Avenue; the Earle Theatre at 1049 Market Street; Chicken Bone Beach in Atlantic City, Glamour Row, and Club Harlem. The Pyramid Club was one of many centers of African-American culture and life in Philadelphia which he documented, working as the club's staff photographer for many years. He published an annual album of photographs for the club, the Pictorial Album of the Pyramid Club. He was also the official photographer of the First African Presbyterian Church in Philadelphia.

Mosley was one of the first black Americans to be a syndicated photographer. His work was widely published in East-coast African-American newspapers such as The Philadelphia Tribune the Philadelphia Evening Bulletin, and The Pittsburgh Courier and appeared in Jet magazine.

== Legacy ==
The Charles L. Blockson Afro-American Collection at Temple University contains more than 300,000 photographs taken by Mosley. Blockson's private collection of materials relating to the history and culture of those of African descent was one of the largest in the United States. Blockson acquired the Mosley photos from Clarence Still and Teresa Still Mosley, John W. Mosley's wife, in 1985.

The curator of the Blockson Collection, Diane Turner, emphasizes the importance of Mosley's work in combating "negative stereotypes and false interpretations of African-American history and culture in Philadelphia and Pennsylvania":

John W. Mosley was documenting the African-American community during a period from the 1930s through the 1960s when there were many stereotypical images of African Americans, ... the Mosley photographs ... represented an accurate record of Black Philadelphia.

Charles L. Blockson wrote a biography of Mosley's life, The journey of John W. Mosley (1992).

The exhibition A Celebration of African-American Life in Philadelphia, 1930's – 1960's: Selected Photographs by John W. Mosley was shown at the Philadelphia International Airport in 2012.

A retrospective of Mosley's work, A Million Faces: The Photography of John W. Mosley, appeared at the Woodmere Art Museum in Philadelphia in 2016.

Mosley's work was included in the 2025 exhibition Photography and the Black Arts Movement, 1955–1985 at the National Gallery of Art.

== Resources ==
- Blockson, Charles L. (1992). The journey of John W. Mosley. Philadelphia: Quantum Leap Publisher. ISBN 978-0962716171.
