= Barkley L. Hendricks =

American painter (1945–2017)

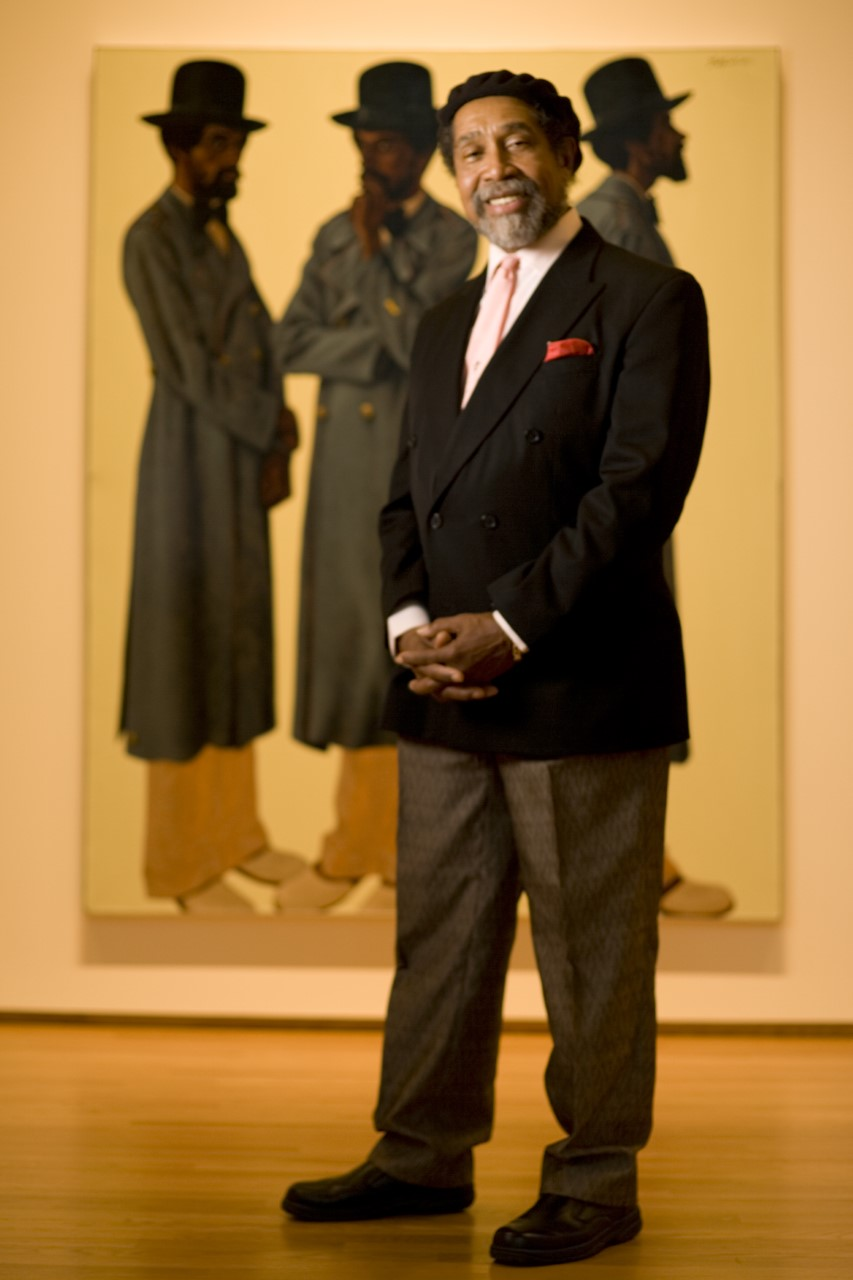
- Barkley L. Hendricks strikes a pose in front of Bahsir (Robert Gowens), 1975. Nasher Museum of Art at Duke University. Photo by Duke Photography.
- Born: Barkley Leonnard Hendricks; April 16, 1945; Nicetown–Tioga, Philadelphia
- Died: April 18, 2017 (aged 72); New London, Connecticut
- Education: Pennsylvania Academy of the Fine Arts; Yale University
- Known for: Portraiture
- Spouse: Susan Weig (m. 1983)

Barkley L. Hendricks (April 16, 1945 – April 18, 2017) was a contemporary American painter who made pioneering contributions to Black portraiture and conceptualism. While he worked in a variety of media and genres throughout his career (from photography to landscape painting), Hendricks' best known work took the form of life-sized painted oil portraits of Black Americans.

== Early life ==
Born on April 16, 1945, in the North Philadelphia neighborhood of Tioga, Barkley Leonnard Hendricks was the eldest surviving child of Ruby Powell Hendricks and Barkley Herbert Hendricks. His parents moved to Philadelphia from Halifax County, Virginia, during the Great Migration when large numbers of African-Americans moved out of the rural Southern United States. Hendricks attended Simon Gratz High School and graduated in 1963. He attended Pennsylvania Academy of the Fine Arts (PAFA). After graduating from PAFA in 1967, Hendricks decided to enlist in the New Jersey National Guard and found work as an arts and crafts teacher with the Philadelphia Department of Recreation. In 1970, he began attending Yale University and graduated in 1972 with both a bachelor's and master's degree. At Yale, he studied with Bernard Chaet, Lester Johnson, Gabor Peterdi, Robert Reed, and the photographer Walker Evans.

== Career ==
Hendricks was Professor of Studio Art at Connecticut College, where he taught drawing, illustration, oil and watercolor painting, and photography, from 1972 until his retirement in 2010, when he became Professor Emeritus. In the mid-1960s while touring Europe, he fell in love with the portrait style of artists like van Dyck and Velázquez. In his visits to the museums and churches of Britain, Italy, Spain and the Netherlands, he found his own race was absent from Western art, leaving a void that troubled him. As the Black Power movement gained momentum, Hendricks set about to change what he saw in Europe by correcting the balance, in life-size portraits of friends, relatives and strangers, encountered on the street, that communicated a new assertiveness and pride among Black Americans. In these portraits, he attempted to imbue a proud, dignified presence upon his subjects. He frequently painted Black Americans against monochrome interpretations of urban northeastern American backdrops. Hendricks' work is considered unique in its marriage of American realism and post-modernism. Although Hendricks did not pose his subjects as celebrities, victims, or protesters, the subjects depicted in his works were often the voices of under-represented Black people of the 1960s and 1970s. He was a key figure in the Black Arts Movement and was the first African American to have a solo exhibit at the Frick Collection in Manhattan for his portraits of Black men and women. Hendricks even stood alongside his subjects and featured himself in works. In 1969, he painted one of his first portraits, Lawdy Mama, which depicts a young woman (his second cousin) in the style of a Byzantine icon with gold leaf surrounding her modernly-dressed figure and Angela Davis style afro on an arched canvas. Hendricks said the portraits were about people he knew, and were only political because of the culture of the time.

In the 1970s, he produced a series of portraits of young black men, usually placed against monochromatic backdrops, that captured their self-assurance and confident sense of style. In 1974, Hendricks painted What’s Going On, one of his best-known portraits, named after Marvin Gaye's single What's Going On. In 1977, Hendricks' work appeared in the exhibition, “Four Young Realists,” at ACA Gallery in New York City. The show received critical acclaim, including the response of the prominent art critic, Hilton Kramer, whose review focused largely on Hendricks' work. Kramer praised Hendricks, but referred to his style using racist terms such as "slick," and called him "brilliantly endowed." Hendricks painted two self portraits in response: the first was Brilliantly Endowed (Self portrait), 1977, a full-frontal nude self-portrait in which he is wearing only sports socks and sneakers, some jewelry, glasses and a white leather applejack hat. In the second, Slick, 1977, also a frontal view, Hendricks depicts himself wearing a kufi cap, a symbol of his African American identity, and wearing a white suit.

Hendricks' work is included in a number of major museum collections, including the National Gallery of Art, the National Portrait Gallery, the Philadelphia Museum of Art, the Studio Museum in Harlem, the Tate Modern, and the National Endowment for the Arts. He stopped painting portraits from 1984 to 2002 to concentrate on other practices like landscape painting and photography, including portraits of jazz musicians, such as Miles Davis and Dexter Gordon. In 1995, his work was the primary revelation in the Whitney Museum of American Art's traveling exhibition, Black Male, which focused on the concept of black masculinity, and also launched the career of Kehinde Wiley. Anna Arabindan-Kesson of the Tate Modern has offered a critical evaluation of Wiley's debt to Hendricks.

Hendricks' paintings Icon for My Man Superman, 1969, and Brilliantly Endowed (Self portrait), 1977, have been especially influential works. Both have inspired tributes from prominent artists. Fahamu Pecou's Nunna My Heros: After Barkley Hendricks’ 'Icon for My Man Superman,' 1969, 2011, explicitly pays homage to Hendricks, whom he has notably credited as an inspiration: "It was truly one of the first experiences where I saw myself reflected, not just culturally, but in terms of my own visual aesthetics and approach to art." Similarly, Rashid Johnson's Self-Portrait in Homage to Barkley Hendricks, 2005, reenacted Brilliantly Endowed for the camera, almost 30 years later.

In 1984, Hendricks turned away from painted portraiture during a period he referred to as the "Ronaissance," during the years of the Ronald Reagan presidency. For the next 18 years, he concentrated primarily on landscape painting and photography, but returned to painting portraits for the last 15 years of his life. His return to portraiture came with his painting of Nigerian Afrobeat legend, Fela Kuti, which he painted for the "Black President" exhibition at the New Museum of Contemporary Art in 2003. Hendricks' first career painting retrospective, titled Barkley L. Hendricks: Birth of the Cool, with works dating from 1964 to 2008, was organized by Trevor Schoonmaker at the Nasher Museum of Art at Duke University in spring 2008, then traveled to the Studio Museum in Harlem, the Santa Monica Museum of Art, the Pennsylvania Academy of the Fine Arts, and the Contemporary Arts Museum Houston. Hendricks's work was featured on the cover of the April 2009 issue of Artforum Magazine, with an extensive review of Barkley L. Hendricks: Birth of the Cool. Hendricks' work was included in the 2015 exhibition We Speak: Black Artists in Philadelphia, 1920s-1970s at the Woodmere Art Museum. His work, New Orleans Niggah, 1973, hung in the National Museum of African American History and Culture in Washington, D.C., when it opened in 2016. In 2017 Hendricks’s portraits were included in Prospect.4: The Lotus in Spite of the Swamp, installed in the Great Hall of the New Orleans Museum of Art. It was the largest and most significant presentation of his portraits since Birth of the Cool, with works ranging from 1970 to 2016. In early 2018, MassArt's Bakalar & Paine Galleries mounted the exhibition, “Legacy of the Cool: A Tribute to Barkley L. Hendricks,” which featured 24 artists who had been inspired by Hendricks. "Legacy of the Cool" included work by such notable artists as Rashid Johnson, Amy Sherald, Hank Willis Thomas, Thomashi Jackson, Toyin Ojih Odutola, Delphine Diallo, and Nona Faustine. Hendricks was represented by Jack Shainman Gallery in New York City. In 2023 and 2024, the Nasher Museum of Art at Duke University and the Pérez Art Museum Miami, presented Spirit in the Land, a group show and publication expanding the scholarship on artists working with environmental and cultural issues in North America and the Caribbean.

In May 2019 Sotheby's Auction House sold Hendricks' Yocks, 1975, for $3.72 million, nearly double its $2.2 million sale of the year before and far higher than the portrait's 2017 $942,500, when it was a record for the artist.

Hendricks's work was included in the 2025 exhibition Photography and the Black Arts Movement, 1955–1985 at the National Gallery of Art.

== Abbreviated list of artworks ==
- Lawdy Mama, 1969 The Studio Museum in Harlem
- Icon for My Man Superman (Superman never saved any black people — Bobby Seale), 1969 Privately owned
- Sir Charles, Alias Willie Harris, 1972 National Gallery of Art, Washington DC
- George Jules Taylor, 1972 National Gallery of Art, Washington DC
- New Orleans Niggah, 1973 National Afro-American Museum and Cultural Center, Wilberforce, Ohio, on loan to the Smithsonian Institution's National Museum of African American History and Culture.
- Blood (Donald Formey), 1975 The Wedge Collection, Toronto
- Yocks, 1975, Private collection
- Bahsir (Robert Gowens), 1975. Nasher Museum of Art at Duke University, Durham, NC
- Steve, 1976. Whitney Museum of American Art
- Brilliantly Endowed (Self Portrait), 1977
- Slick, 1977. Chrysler Museum of Art, Norfolk, VA
- View From Behind the School, 2000. Nasher Museum of Art at Duke University, Durham, NC
- Photo Bloke, 2016, Private Collection

== Selected published works ==
Catalogs featuring Hendrick's work include:

- Wasserman, Burton. Exploring the Visual Arts, 1976, Davis Publications, Inc ISBN 9780871920850
- Hendricks, Barkley L., and Mary Schmidt Campbell. Barkley L. Hendricks: Oils, Watercolors, Collages and Photographs: [an Exhibition] January 20 – March 30, 1980, the Studio Museum in Harlem. New York, N.Y.: The Museum, 1980.
- Thelma Golden. Black Male: Representations of Masculinity in Contemporary American Art, 1994
- 25 Years of African-American Art, The Studio Museum in Harlem, 1995
- The Barkley L. Hendricks Experience (exhibition catalogue). Lyman Allyn Art Museum, ca. 2001.
- Schoonmaker, Trevor. Black President: The Art and Legacy of Fela Anikulapo Kuti (exhibition catalogue) New York: New Museum of Contemporary Art (2003). ISBN 9780915557875
- Schoonmaker, Trevor. Barkley L. Hendricks: Birth of the Cool. Durham, NC: Nasher Museum of Art, Duke University, 2008. ISBN 9780938989318 (Republished in 2017)
- 30 Americans: Rubell Family Collection (exhibition catalogue). Texts by Robert Hobbs, Franklin Sirmans, and Michele Wallace. New York: D.A.P./Distributed Art Pub. (2008).
- Powell, Richard J. Cutting a Figure: Fashioning Black Portraiture. Chicago: University of Chicago Press, 2009. ISBN 9780226677279
- Schoonmaker, Trevor. Prospect.4: The Lotus in Spite of the Swamp. Munich: Prestel, 2017. ISBN 9783791356792
- Hendricks, Barkley L. Basketball. Milan: Skira, 2020. ISBN 9788857241487
- Hendricks, Barkley L. Photography. Milan: Skira, 2020. ISBN 9788857241500
- Ng, Aimee and Antwaun Sargent. Barkley L. Hendricks: Portraits at The Frick. New York: Rizzoli Electa, 2023 ISBN 9780847873593

== Personal life and death ==
Hendricks married Susan Weig in 1983. They were married until his death in 2017.

Hendricks died in his home on the morning of April 18, 2017, in New London, Connecticut, from a cerebral hemorrhage.
