= African American Museum in Philadelphia =

Museum in Philadelphia, Pennsylvania, USA

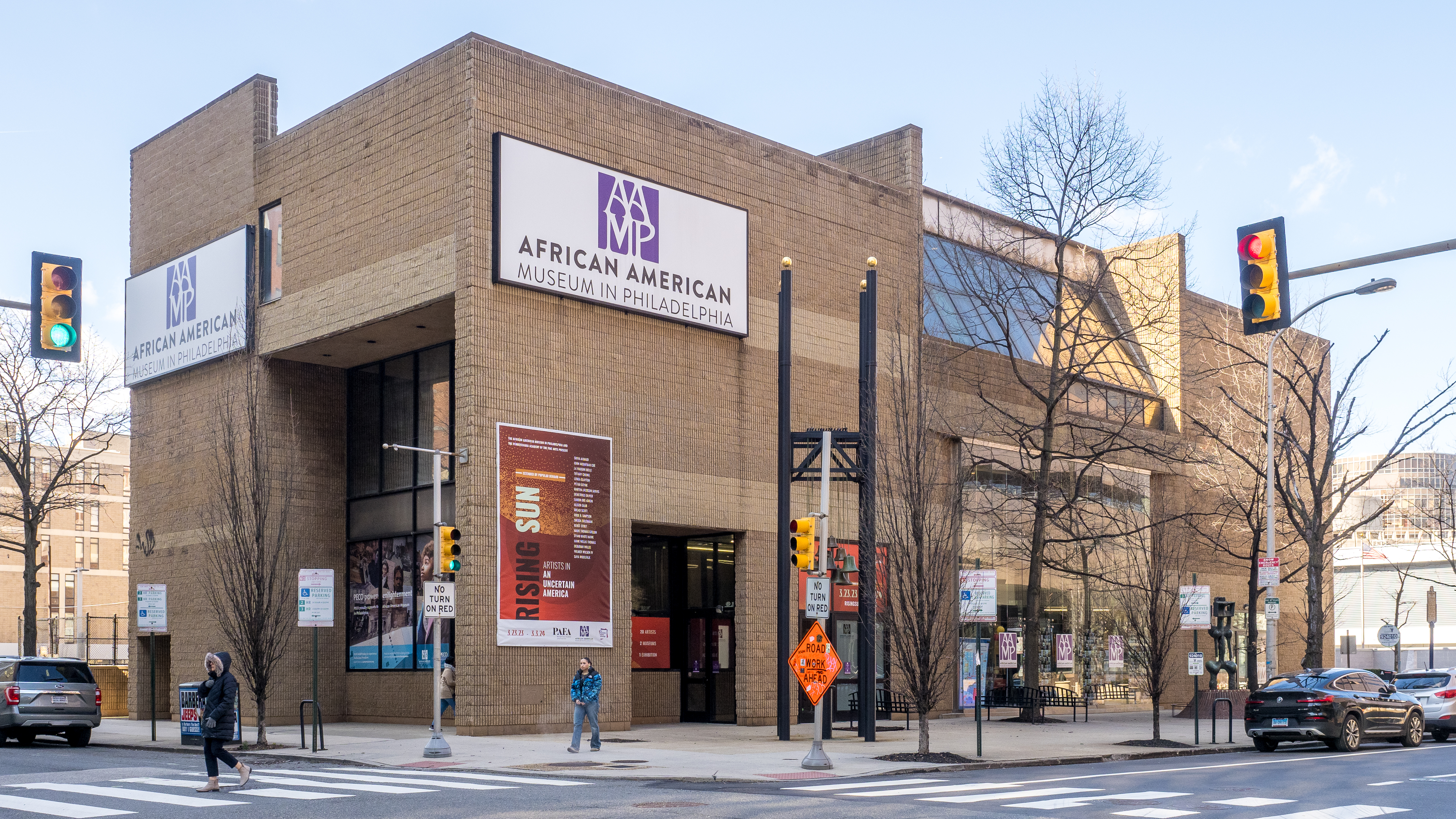
- (2024)
- Former name: Afro-American Historical and Cultural Museum
- Established: 1976
- Location: 701 Arch Street; Philadelphia, Pennsylvania, U.S.
- Coordinates: 39.952797°N 75.151569°W
- Directors: Ashley Jordan, Ph.D.
- Curator: Dejay Duckett
- Public transit access: SEPTA bus: 47, 48
- Website: https://www.aampmuseum.org/

The African American Museum in Philadelphia (AAMP) is notable as the first museum funded and built by a municipality to help preserve, interpret and exhibit the heritage of African Americans. Opened during the 1976 Bicentennial celebrations, the AAMP is located in historic Philadelphia on Arch Street, a few blocks away from the Liberty Bell. It was formerly known as the Afro-American Historical and Cultural Museum.

== Collection ==
AAMP currently houses four galleries and an auditorium, each of which offers exhibitions anchored on one of three dominant themes: The African Diaspora, the Philadelphia Story, and the Contemporary Narrative.

The museum is home to more than 750,000 objects, images and documents that are made available for research, exhibitions, for loan to other museums, and used in the museum's many educational programs. Temporary exhibits, as well as a variety of family events, workshops, films, tours, symposiums, and concerts relating to African-American culture and history are offered.

The AAMP's collection includes, among other things, flyers, memos and memorabilia related to the Philadelphia Black Panthers, correspondence clippings and military artifacts of the first black doctor to direct a U.S. Army Hospital, academic and legal papers from Harry Shapiro on constitutional issues arising from the civil rights movement, African American occupational and domestic objects, family scrapbooks, sports memorabilia, church and burial records, and artifacts from the Ku Klux Klan.

== History ==
Philadelphia has long been known as an important center for African American history and culture. As the United States was being formed in the 18th century, Philadelphia was the center of the abolitionist movement and had the largest free black population.

Charles H. Wesley was a noted African American historian, educator, and author. He was the fourth African American to receive a Ph.D. from Harvard University. An ordained minister, Wesley's distinguished career included 40 years of leadership with the African Methodist Episcopal Church. In 1976, he served as Director of what was then known as the Afro-American Historical and Cultural Museum in Philadelphia.

In 1997 the Afro-American Historical and Cultural Museum became known as the African American Museum in Philadelphia, under executive director Terri S. Rouse.

In 2007, the AAMP received a $3 million grant from the city of Philadelphia for building renovations and improving displays for the museum's extensive collection. The museum closed March 9, 2009, and reopened June 18, 2009, with the unveiling of AUDACIOUS FREEDOM, a new core exhibit installation featuring the early history of African Americans in Philadelphia (1776–1876).

== Affiliations ==
The African American Museum in Philadelphia is a member of the Smithsonian Institution Affiliations Program.

== See also ==
- History of the African-Americans in Philadelphia
- List of museums focused on African Americans
