= Woodmere Art Museum =

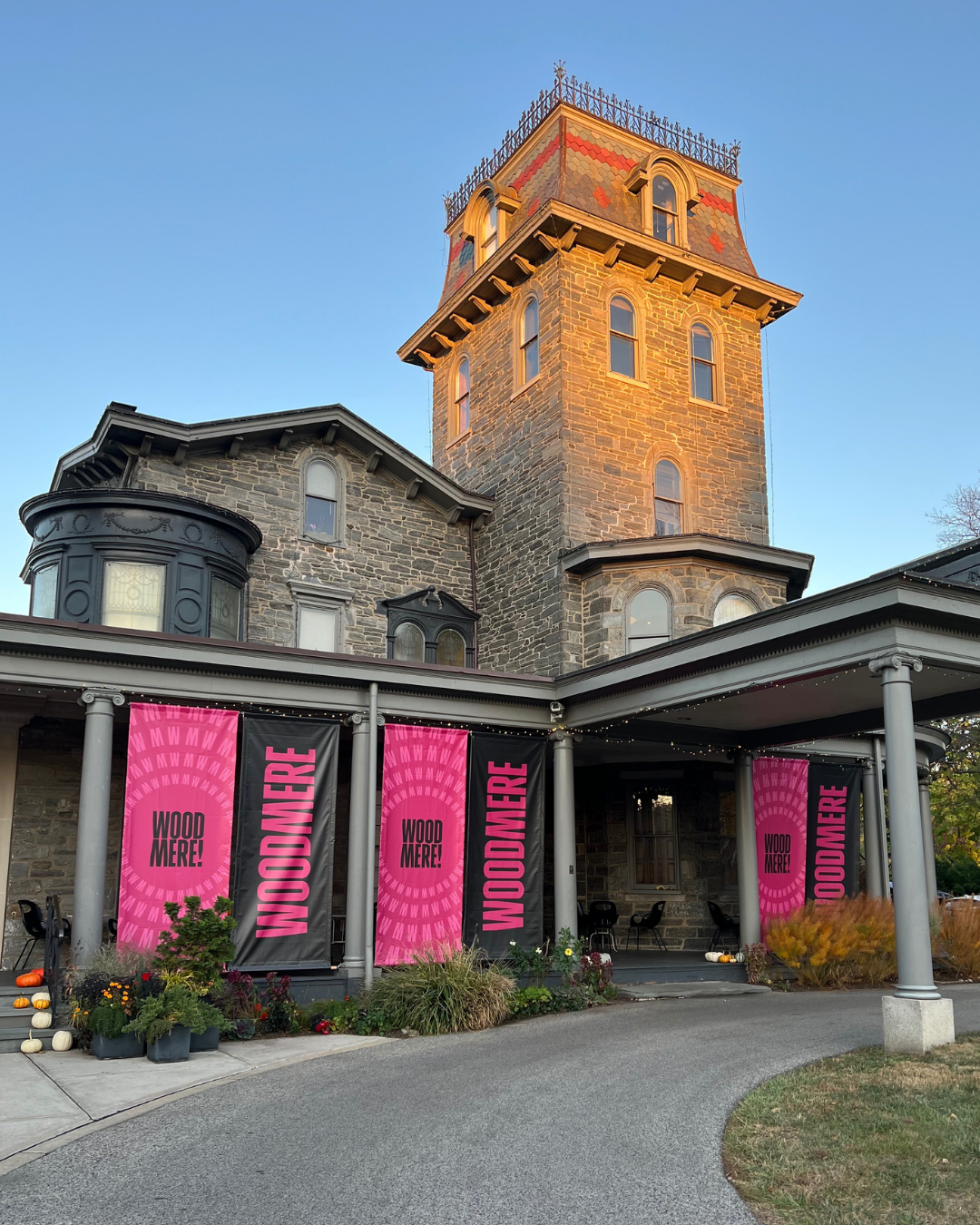
- Chalres Knox Smith Hall at Woodmere Art Museum

- Location within Pennsylvania Location within the United States
- Established: 1940
- Location: 9201 Germantown Avenue, Chestnut Hill, Philadelphia, Pennsylvania and 9001 Germantown Avenue, Chestnut Hill, Philadelphia, Pennsylvania
- Coordinates: 40.0831°N 75.2195°W
- Type: Art museum
- Public transit access: SEPTA bus: 51, 97
- Website: Woodmeremuseum.org

Woodmere is an art museum located in the Chestnut Hill neighborhood of Philadelphia, Pennsylvania. It has a collection of over 8,000 works of art focused on Philadelphia artists. Charles Knox Smith bequeathed his Woodmere estate and 600 pieces of art to be used as a museum after his death in 1916. The museum was founded in 1940 as the Woodmere Art Gallery with one building, Charles Knox Smith Hall, and six acres of sculpture garden. The museum was significantly expanded in 2025 with the purchase and renovation of the nearby Frances M. Maguire Hall of Art and Education, and four acres of sculpture garden.

== Description ==
The museum is located at 9201 Germantown Avenue in Philadelphia and contains over 8,000 works of art. It consists of two separate properties, the Charles Knox Smith Hall on six acres of land and the Francis M. Maguire Hall for Art and Education on four acres. The properties are two blocks apart and are connected by a public sidewalk.

The focus of the museum is on Philadelphia artists. The galleries contain works from many notable artists including Thomas Pollock Anshutz, Severo Antonelli, Arthur Beecher Carles, Bo Bartlett, George Biddle, Syd Carpenter, Jasper Francis Cropsey, Martha Mayer Erlebacher, Violet Oakley, Walter Schofield, Danny Simmons, and Ellen Powell Tiberino. The museum grounds contain outdoor sculptures from Harry Bertoia, Walter Erlebacher, Harriet Frishmuth, and Steve Tobin.

The museum hosts art classes for adults and children, contains a children's gallery of art from local students, and sponsors jazz concerts and events for families.

== History ==
The museum was founded by Charles Knox Smith, a leader in arts, industry, and politics in Philadelphia. He was a member of the Philadelphia City Council, made his fortune in oil and mining, and invested in the collection of art. He lived in the city, but purchased the nine-acre Woodmere estate in 1890 to house his collection of 600 pieces of art and allow them to be viewed in a more rural setting. He hired the architect George Howe to build galleries in the mansion. He first opened the museum to the public in 1910.

After Smith's death in 1916, he bequeathed his Woodmere residence and his art to be used as a public museum. Due to issues from residents in the house and lawsuits from other Philadelphia museums, the Woodmere Art Museum opening was delayed until 1940.

Edith Emerson served as the director for the museum from the 1940s to 1978 and further refined the emphasis on Philadelphia artists to mostly women artists.

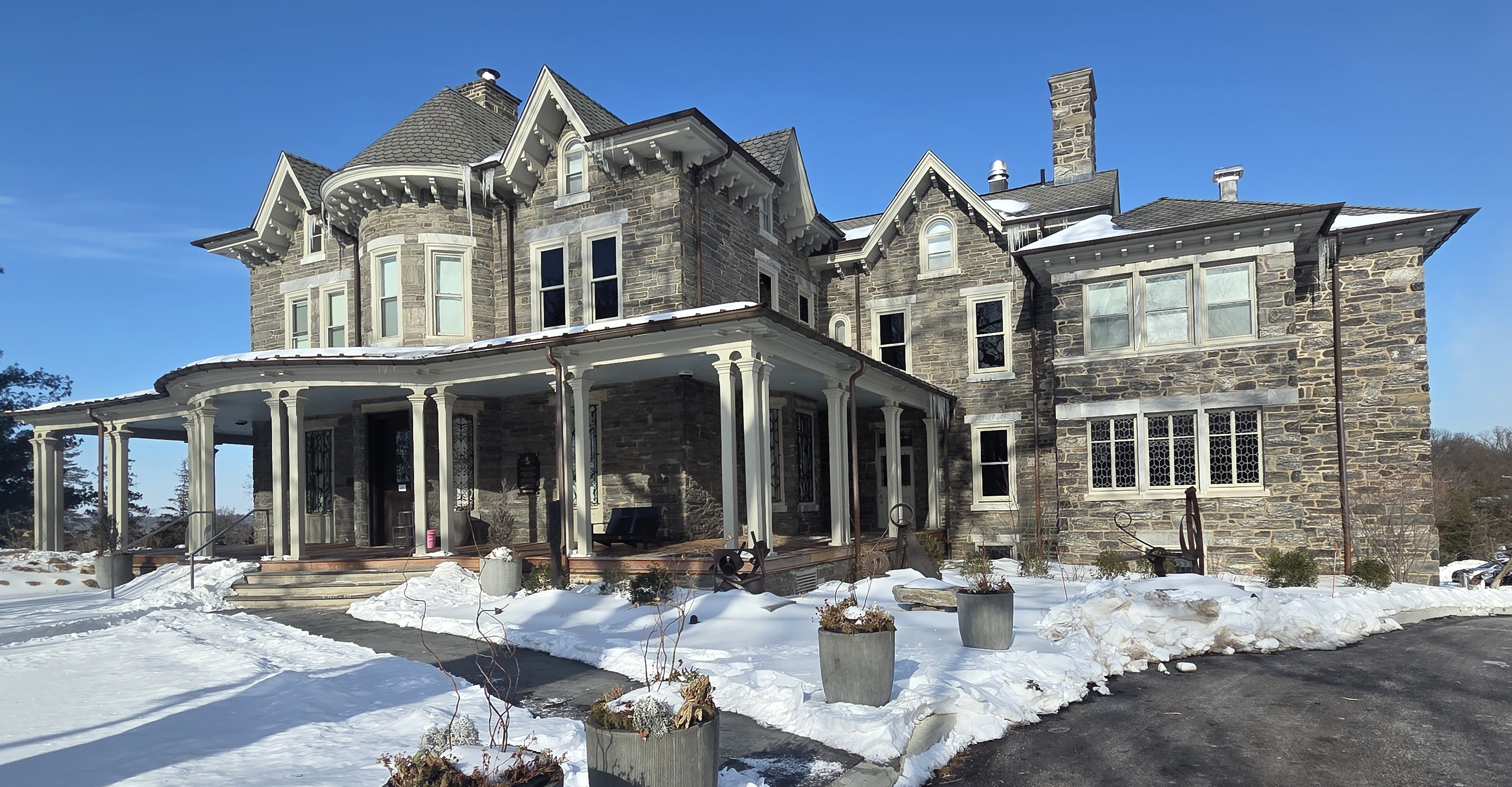
The Frances M Maguire Hall of Art and Education was opened in October 2025

In 2021, Woodmere purchased a building from the Sisters of St. Joseph that had fallen into disrepair. The building was renovated and opened in October 2025 as the Frances M. Maguire Hall for Art and Education. The building is 17,000 square feet, sits on 4 acres of land, and contains 14 galleries and a studio for art education. The addition of the second building allowed the museum to display additional items from their permanent collection including use of the second floor for impressionist painters and the basement level for display of jewelry art.

== Collection highlights ==
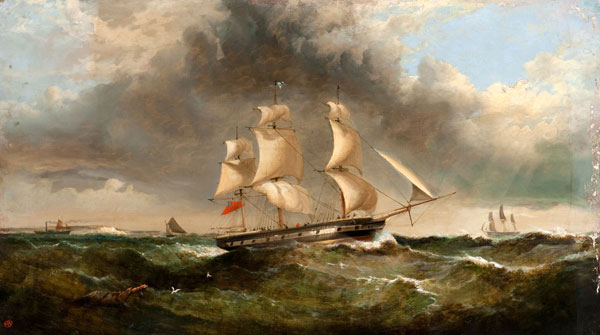
Sailing before a Gale (undated), by Alfred Thompson Bricher

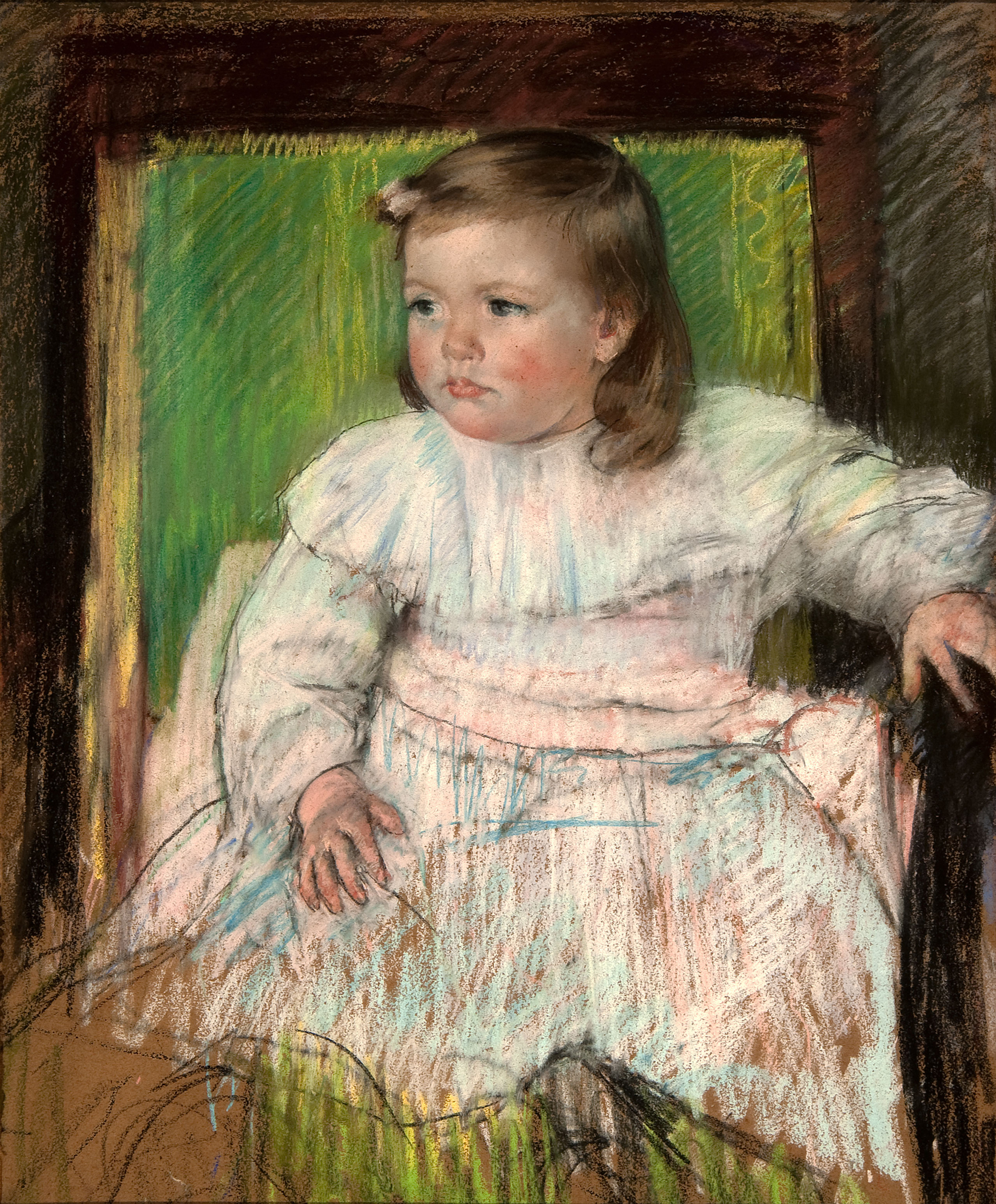
The Pink Sash (1898), by Mary Cassatt

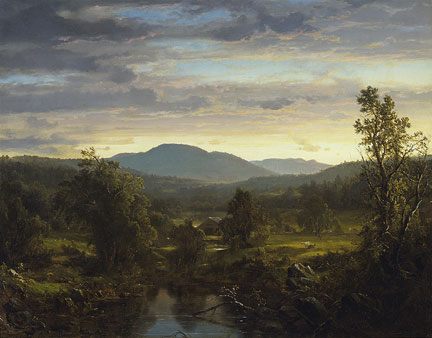
Sunset in the Berkshire Hills (1857), by Frederic Edwin Church

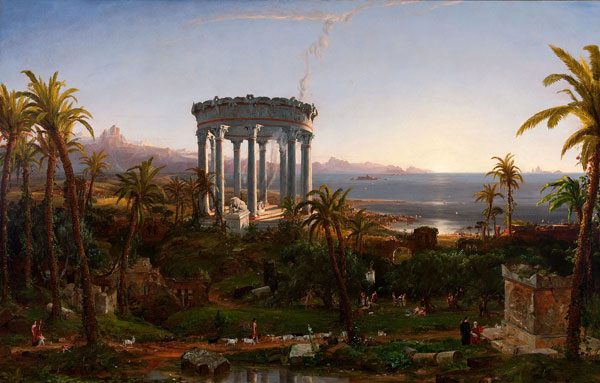
The Spirit of Peace (1851), by Jasper Francis Cropsey

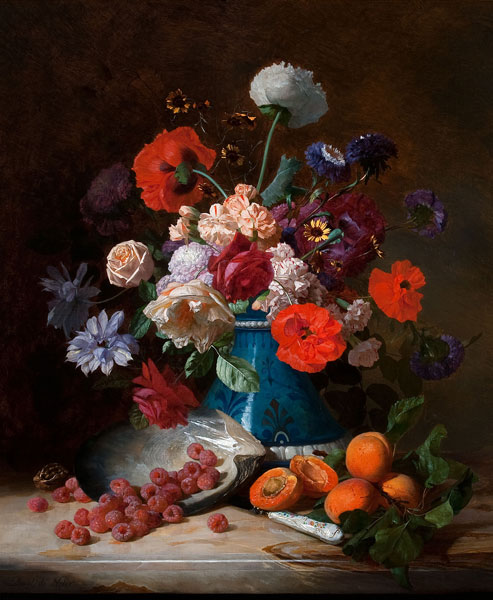
Fruit and Flowers (undated), by David de Noter

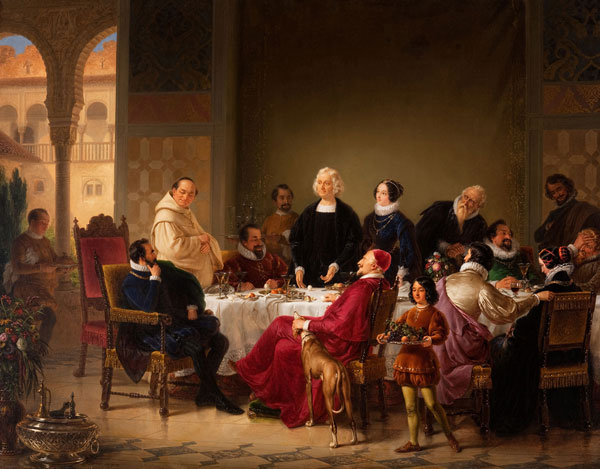
Columbus and the Egg (1847), by Johann Geyer

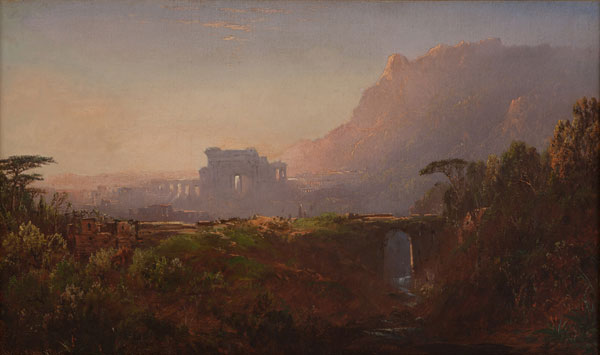
A Dream of Italy (undated), by William Louis Sonntag Sr.

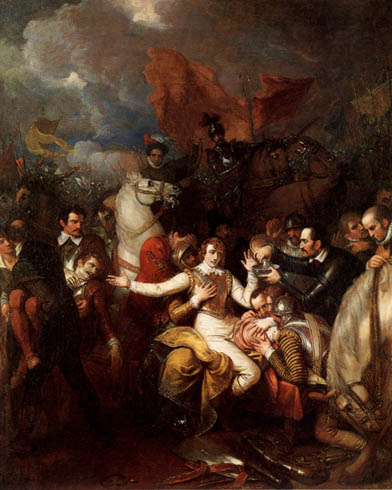
The Fatal Wounding of Sir Philip Sidney (1805), by Benjamin West
