= List of Pennsylvania Academy of the Fine Arts people =

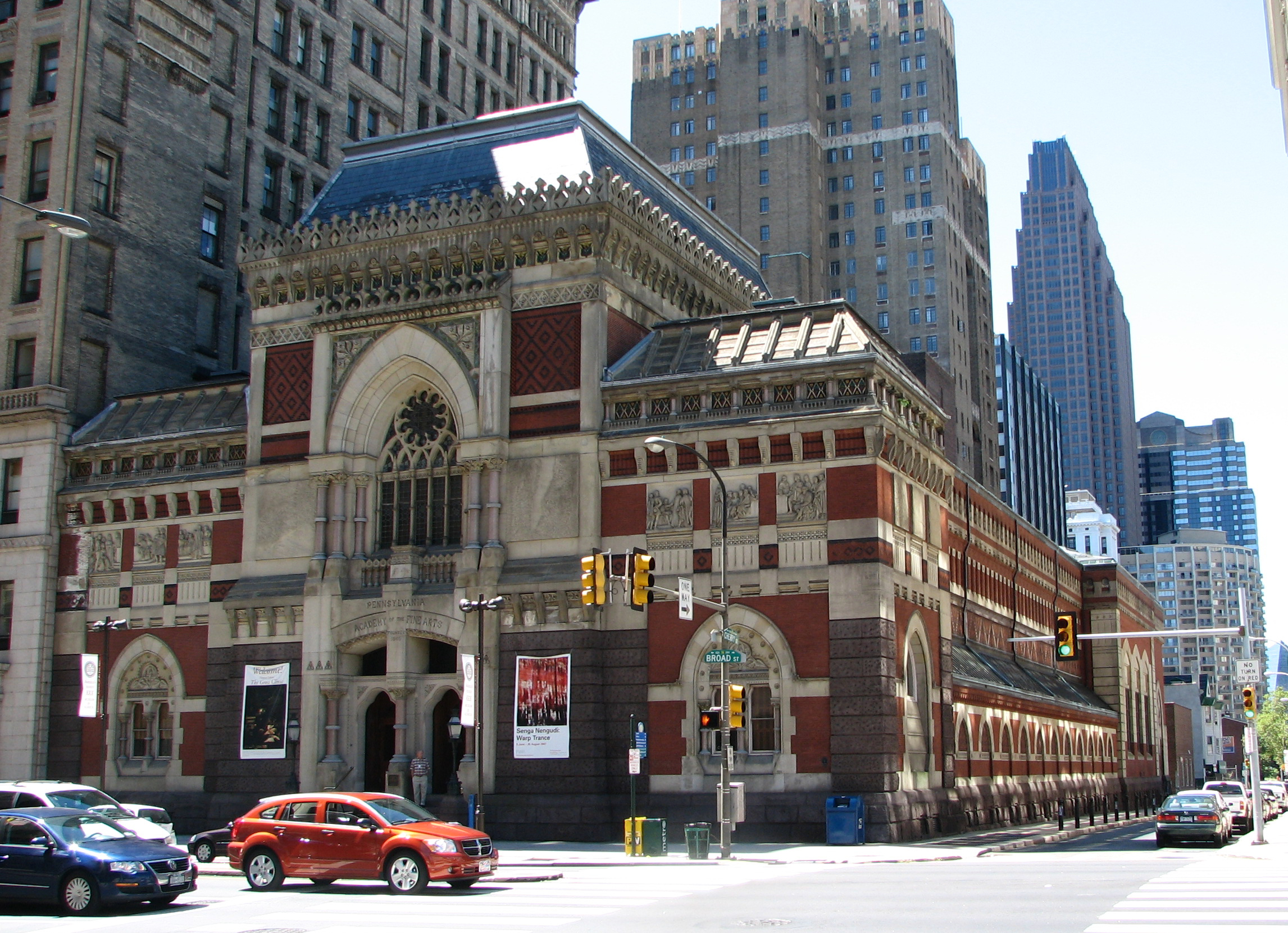
Pennsylvania Academy of the Fine Arts in 2007

This is a list of people from the Pennsylvania Academy of the Fine Arts (PAFA), a private art school founded in 1805, in Philadelphia, Pennsylvania, United States. It is the oldest school of this type in the United States. Although it ceased to offer a Bachelor of Fine Arts degree in the 2024–2025 academic year, the certificate programs and other instruction continue. This list includes notable alumni, faculty, honorary degree awardees, PAFA founders, school directors, and school presidents.

== Notable alumni ==
=== Architects and designers ===
- Thomas Harlan Ellett (1890–1951), architect
- Elise Mercur (1864–1947), architect

=== Cartoonists and illustrators ===
- Cornelia Barns (1888–1941), illustrator, political cartoonist, painter, feminist, and socialist
- Al Capp (1909–1979), cartoonist, only attended briefly
- A. B. Frost (1851–1928), illustrator, graphic artist, painter, cartoonist
- William Glackens (1870–1938), illustrator
- Frederic Rodrigo Gruger (1871–1953), illustrator, genre painter
- Frances Tipton Hunter (1896–1957), illustrator
- Maria Louise Kirk (1860–1938), illustrator, painter
- Dorothy Pulis Lathrop (1891–1980), writer, illustrator of children's books
- Don Martin (1931–2000; class of 1952), cartoonist
- Katherine Milhous (1894–1977), graphic artist, illustrator, writer
- Violet Oakley (1874–1961; class of 1896), teacher, illustrator, muralist, writer

=== Painters ===
- Thomas Pollock Anshutz (1851–1912), painter, educator
- Elizabeth Gowdy Baker (1860–1927), portrait painter
- Bo Bartlett (born 1955; class of 1980), realist painter
- Walter Emerson Baum (1884–1956; attended 1905–1906), painter, founder of the Baum School of Art and the Allentown Art Museum
- Cecilia Beaux (1855–1942), impressionist portrait artist
- Hugh Henry Breckenridge (1870–1937; attended in the 1890s), painter, teacher
- Arthur Beecher Carles (1882–1952; class of 1907), modernist painter
- Mary Cassatt (1844–1926), painter, printmaker
- Jonathan Lyndon Chase (born 1989; MFA 2016), painter
- Margaret Covey Chisholm (1909–1965), portrait painter, muralist
- Colin Campbell Cooper (1856–1937), architectural painter
- John Rogers Cox (1915–1990), magical realism painter
- Ralston Crawford (1906–1978), painter, photographer, printmaker, teacher
- Lucius Crowell (1911–1988), was an American realist artist.
- Jack Delano (1914–1997), Ukrainian-born Puerto Rican photographer, composer, filmmaker
- Vincent Desiderio (born 1955), realist painter
- Thomas Eakins (1844–1916; class of 1861), realist painter, photographer, sculptor, and educator
- Stephen Etnier (1903–1984), realist painter
- Virginia B. Evans (1894–1983), painter, glass designer, teacher
- Katherine Levin Farrell (1857–1951), painter, printmaker
- Louise Fishman (1939–2021), feminist abstract painter
- Charles Lewis Fussell (1840–1909), landscape painter
- Daniel Garber (1880–1958; class of 1917), Impressionist landscape painter
- William W. Gilchrist Jr. (1879–1926), impressionist painter
- William Glackens (1870–1938), realist painter, Ashcan school
- Marie Bruner Haines (1885–1979), painter, muralist, illustrator, teacher
- James Havard (1937–2020), painter, sculptor
- A. G. Heaton (1844–1930), painter, author and numismatist
- Isabelle Bowen Henderson (1899–1969), portraitist and floriculturist
- Barkley L. Hendricks (1945–2017; class of 1967), painter
- Robert Henri (1865–1929), Ashcan school painter, teacher
- Edward Lamson Henry (1841–1919), genre painter
- Elsa Jemne (1887–1974), landscape painter, portraitist, muralist and illustrator
- Lucius Kutchin (1901–1936), portrait painter
- Christine Lafuente (born 1968), painter
- Sara Larkin (1946–2018), painter
- Frank B. A. Linton (1871–1943), portrait-painter and teacher; attended 1885–1886
- Adelia Armstrong Lutz (1859–1931), painter
- John Marin (1870–1953), modernist painter, watercolorist; attended 1899–1901
- Donald Martiny (born 1953), action painter
- Abram Molarsky (1880–1955), Russian Empire–born American impressionist painter
- Edward Percy Moran (1862–1935), painter
- Elizabeth Osborne (born 1936), painter, teacher
- Maxfield Parrish (1870–1966; attended in the 1890s), illustrator, painter
- Francis Petrus Paulus (1862–1933), painter, printmaker
- Clara Elsene Peck (1883–1968), illustrator, painter
- Jane Piper (1916–1991), painter
- Frank Knox Morton Rehn (1848–1914), marine painter
- Jacques Reich (1852–1923), Hungarian-born portrait etcher
- Seymour Remenick (1923–1999), painter, teacher; taught 1977–1996
- Constance Coleman Richardson (1905–2002; class of 1928), painter
- Edgar Preston Richardson (1902–1985; attended in the 1920s), painter, art historian, museum director, author, and curator
- William Sartain (1843–1924), Orientalist painter
- Leopold Seyffert (1887–1956), portrait painter
- Everett Shinn (1876–1953), painter, of the Ashcan School
- John Sloan (1871–1951), painter, one founder of the Ashcan school
- Louis B. Sloan (1932–2008; class of 1957), plein-air painter; first Black full professor at PAFA
- Owen Staples (1866–1949), English-born Canadian painter, printmaker, illustrator, cartoonist, and writer
- LeConte Stewart (1891–1990), LDS landscape painter, printmaker
- Frank Wilbert Stokes (1858–1955), sketch artist and painter
- Henry Ossawa Tanner (1859–1937), early Black painter to gain international acclaims
- Ellen Powell Tiberino (1937–1992), Black figurative and expressionist painter
- William B. T. Trego (1858–1909), military painter
- Orlando Gray Wales (1865–1933), landscape painter and Pennsylvania impressionist
- Philip Fishbourne Wharton (1841–1880), watercolorist, oil painter
- Charles Morris Young (attended in the 1880s), landscape painter
- Samuel P. Ziegler (class of 1913), printmaker, painter, musician, and educator

=== Printmakers ===
- Blanche Dillaye (1851–1931), printmaker, illustrator, part of the etching revival movement; attended 1877–1882
- Katja Oxman (born 1942; BFA 1965), German-born American realism printmaker
- Emily Sartain (1841–1927), painter, printmaker

=== Sculptors ===
- Alexander Milne Calder (1846–1923), sculptor
- Alexander Stirling Calder (1870–1945), sculptor
- Wharton Esherick (1887–1970), sculptor, woodworker, painter, printmaker
- Frank Gasparro (attended 1930s), chief engraver of the United States Mint
- Charles Grafly (1862–1929), sculptor of portrait busts, known for stone work
- Walker Hancock (1901–1998), sculptor, teacher; taught 1929–1967
- Paul Manship (1885–1966), Art Deco sculptor; attended 1907
- James Metcalf (1925–2012), sculptor, led a community for copper artisans in Santa Clara del Cobre, Michoacán, Mexico
- Louise Pershing (1904–1986), sculptor, painter
- Albin Polasek (1879–1965), Czech-born sculptor, teacher
- Lawrence Saint (1885–1961), stained glass artist, worked on the Washington National Cathedral
- David Sherman (1944–2022), sculptor, war novelist, United States Marine Corps veteran

=== Others ===
- David Em (born 1952), pioneering digital artist
- William Weeks Hall (1894–1958), photographer, art critic
- David Lynch (1946–2025), filmmaker; attended in 1966
- Michael H. Shamberg (1952–2014), music video producer, filmmaker
- Howard Smith (1928–2021), designer, ceramicist, painter, sculptor, textile artist, and educator
Alumni of PAFA

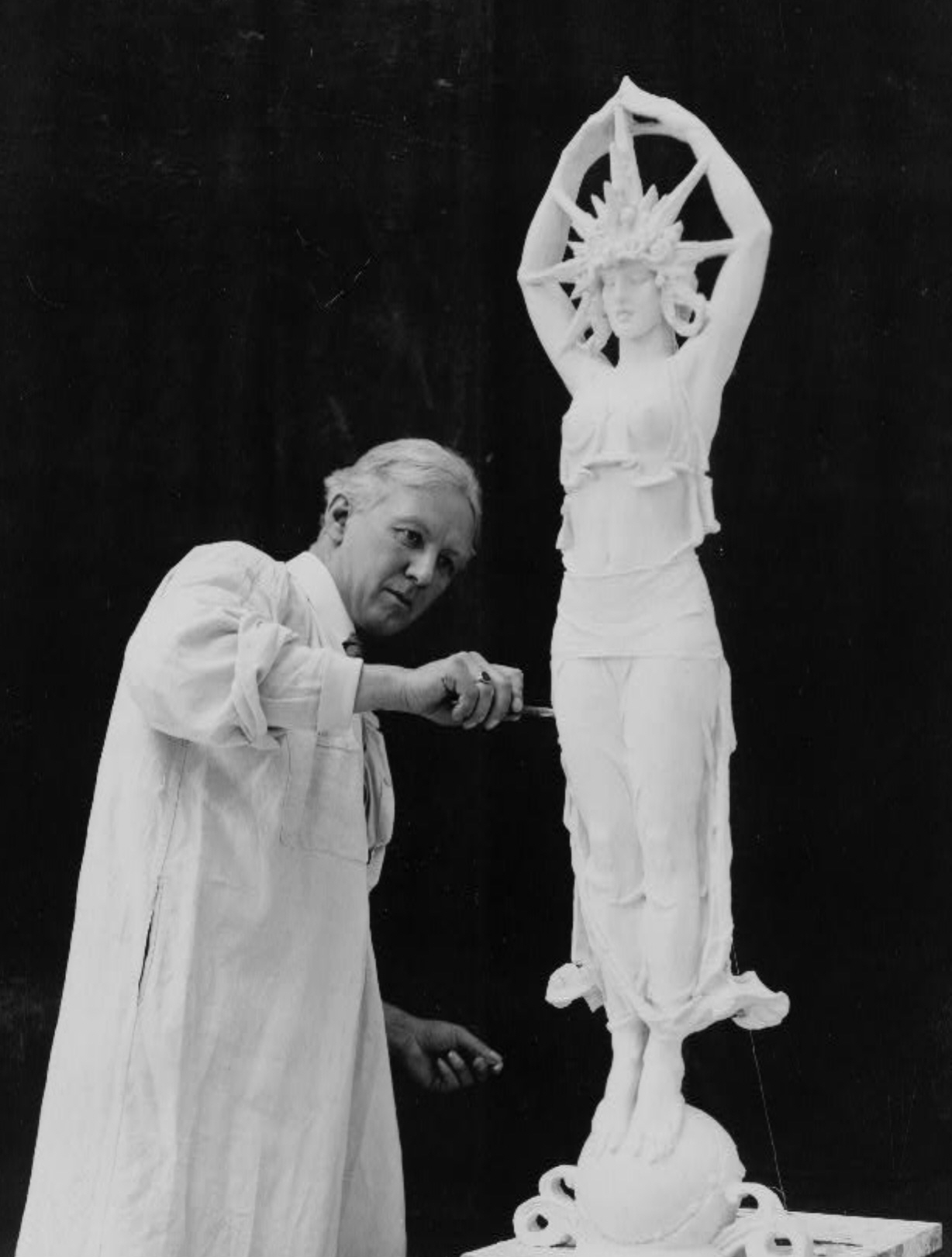
Alexander Stirling Calder

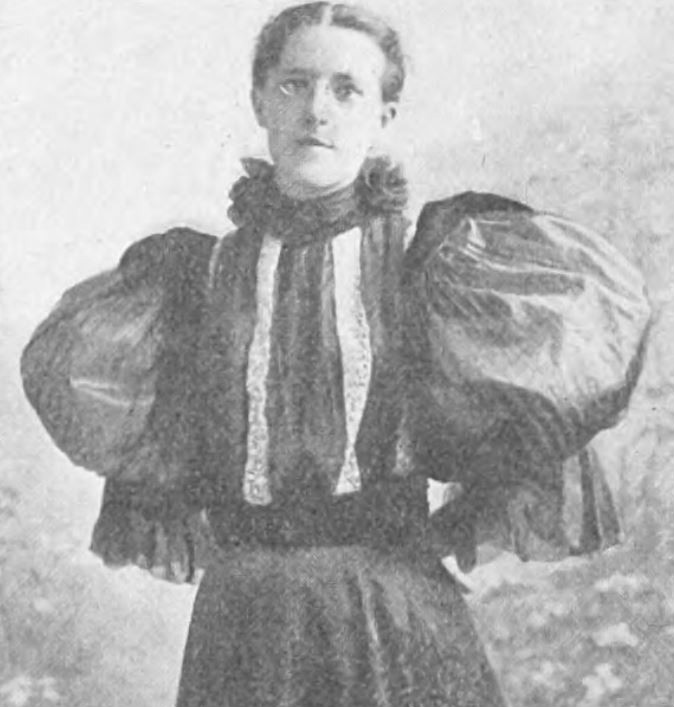
Elise Mercur

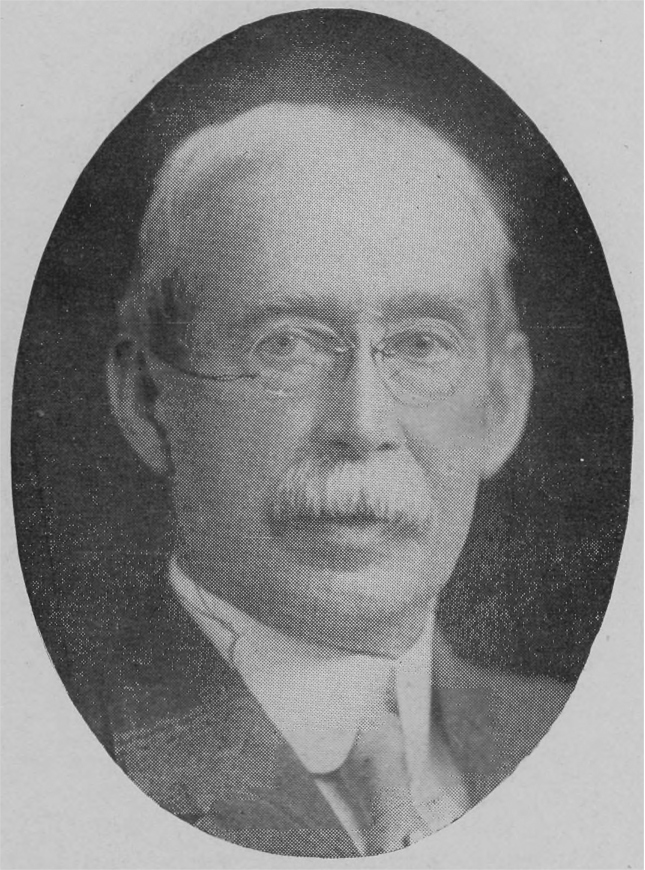
Frank Knox Morton Rehn

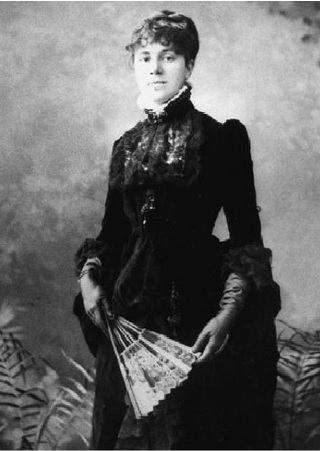
Emily Sartain

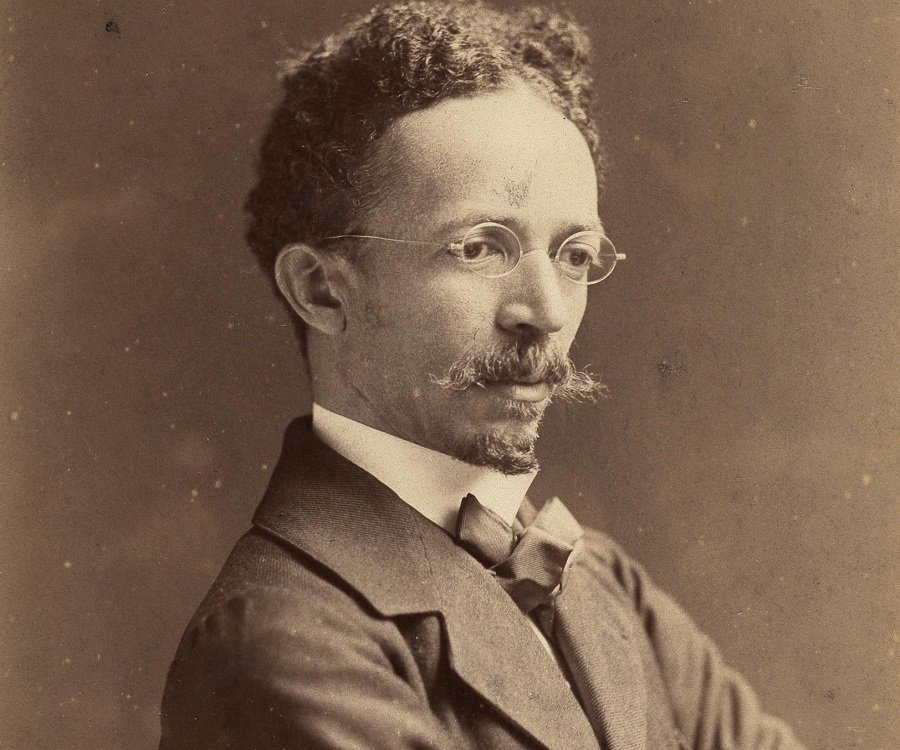
Henry Ossawa Tanner

== Honorary degrees ==
- Linda Lee Alter (honorary PhD 2013), art collector
- Benjamin West (1738–1820; honorary degree 1805), British American painter, first honorary member of the Pennsylvania Academy in 1805

== Notable faculty ==
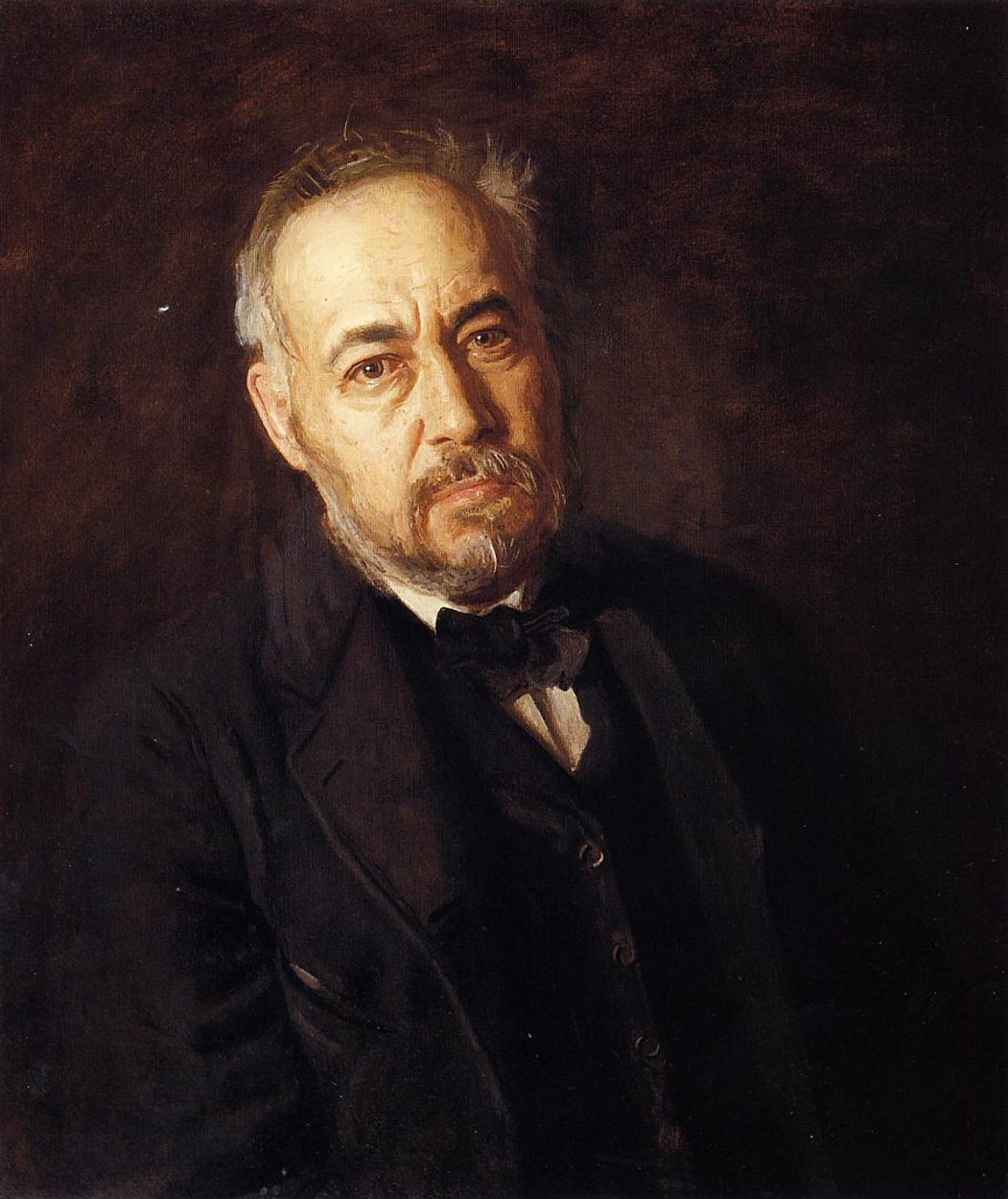
Self portrait (1902), by Thomas Eakins (1844–1916)

=== Painting ===
- Thomas Pollock Anshutz (1851–1912), painter, educator; taught c. 1876–1912
- Will Barnet (1911–2012), painter of human figure and animals
- Cecilia Beaux (1855–1942), impressionist portrait artist, first woman to teach art at PAFA, 1895–1915
- Hugh Henry Breckenridge (1870–1937; attended in the 1890s), painter, taught 1894–1934
- William Merritt Chase (1849–1916), painter, taught 1896–1909
- Thomas Eakins (1844–1916), realist painter, photographer, sculptor, and educator
- Thomas Hovenden (1840–1895), Irish realist painter and teacher
- Henry Bainbridge McCarter (1864–1942), illustrator, and painter; the first PAFA instructor of illustration, taught 1902–1942
- Roy Cleveland Nuse (1885–1975), painter, teacher, taught 1915–1944
- Violet Oakley (1874–1961; class of 1896), teacher, illustrator, muralist, writer; taught 1912–1917
- Elizabeth Osborne (born 1936), painter, teacher
- Seymour Remenick (1923–1999), painter, teacher; taught 1977–1996
- Christian Schussele (1824–1879), portrait painter, taught 1868–1879
- Louis B. Sloan (1932–2008; class of 1957), plein-air painter; first Black full professor at PAFA, taught 1963–1997

=== Printmaking ===
- Martha Zelt, printmaker; taught 1968–1982

=== Sculpture ===
- Charles Grafly (1862–1929), sculptor of portrait busts, known for stone work
- Walker Hancock (1901–1998), sculptor, teacher; taught 1929–1967
Faculty of PAFA

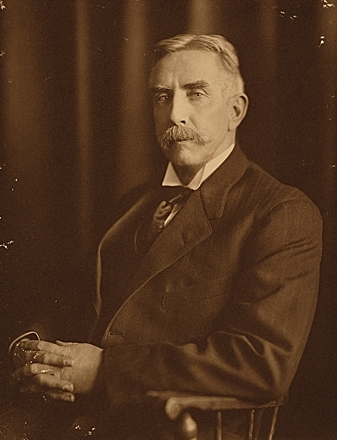
Thomas Pollock Anshutz

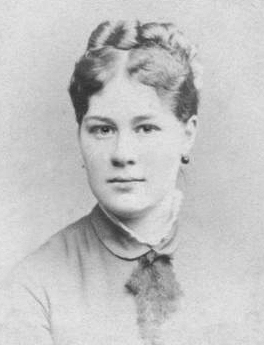
Cecilia Beaux

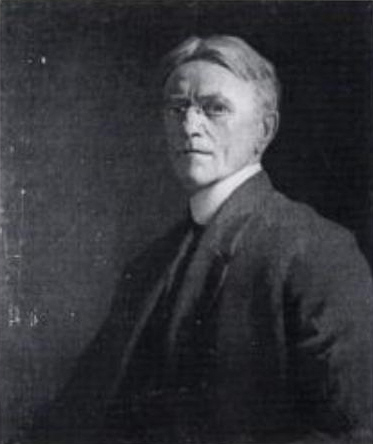
Hugh Henry Breckenridge

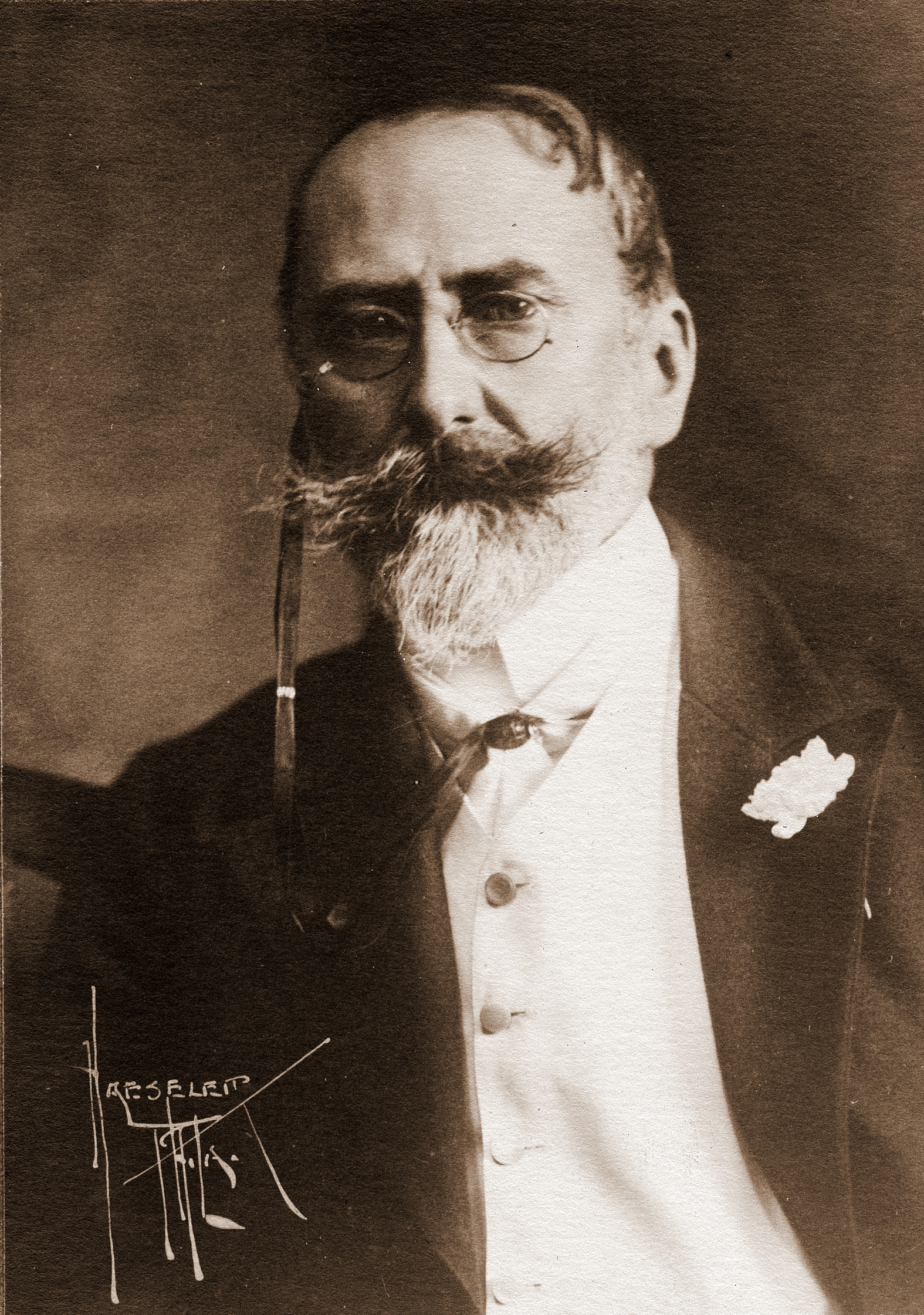
William Merritt Chase

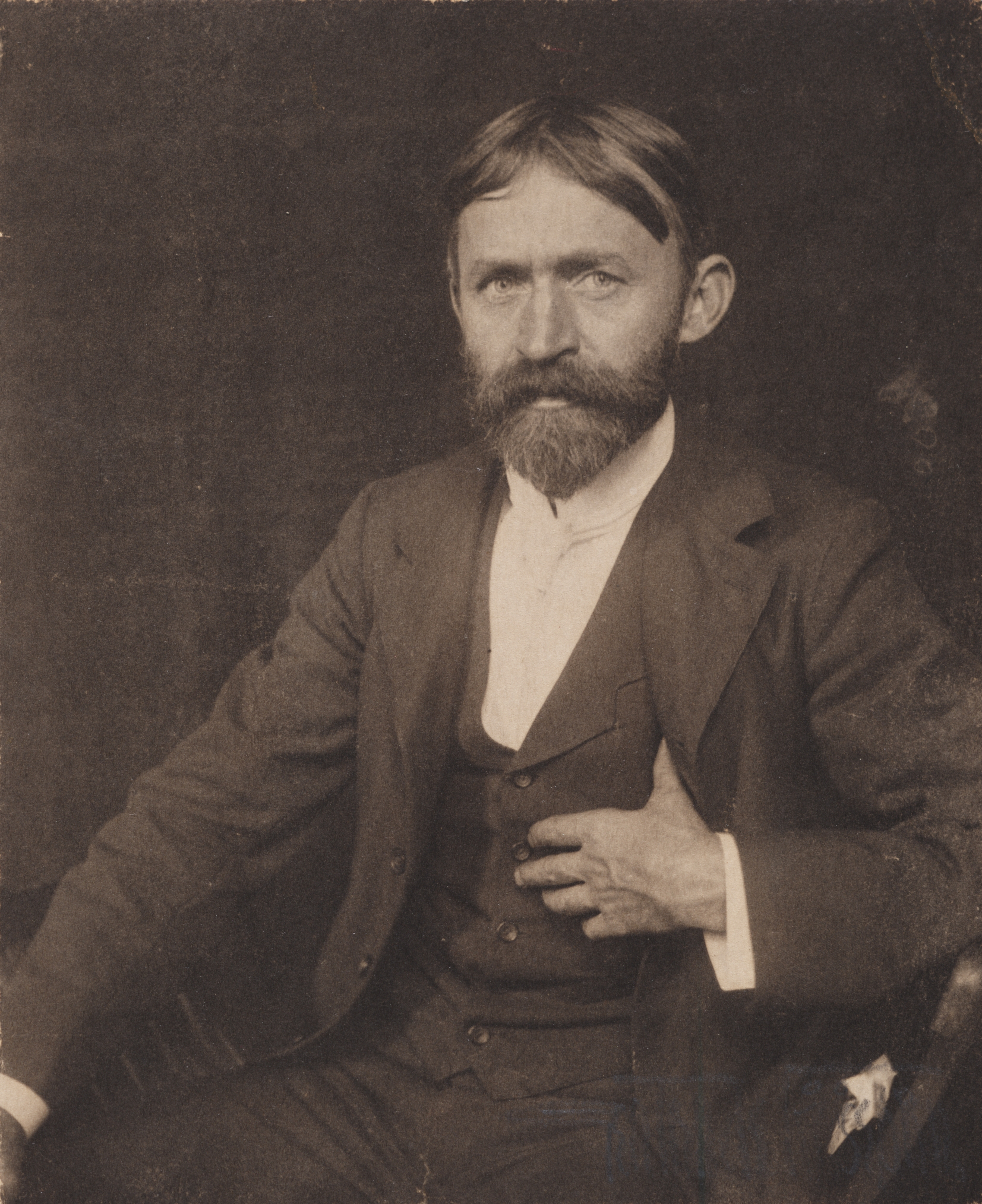
John Henry Twachtman

== PAFA founders ==
- Charles Willson Peale (1741–1827), painter, military officer, scientist, naturalist, founder of PAFA in 1805
- Rembrandt Peale (1778–1860), painter, founder of PAFA in 1805
- William Rush (1756–1833), sculptor, founder of PAFA in 1805

== List of directors and presidents ==
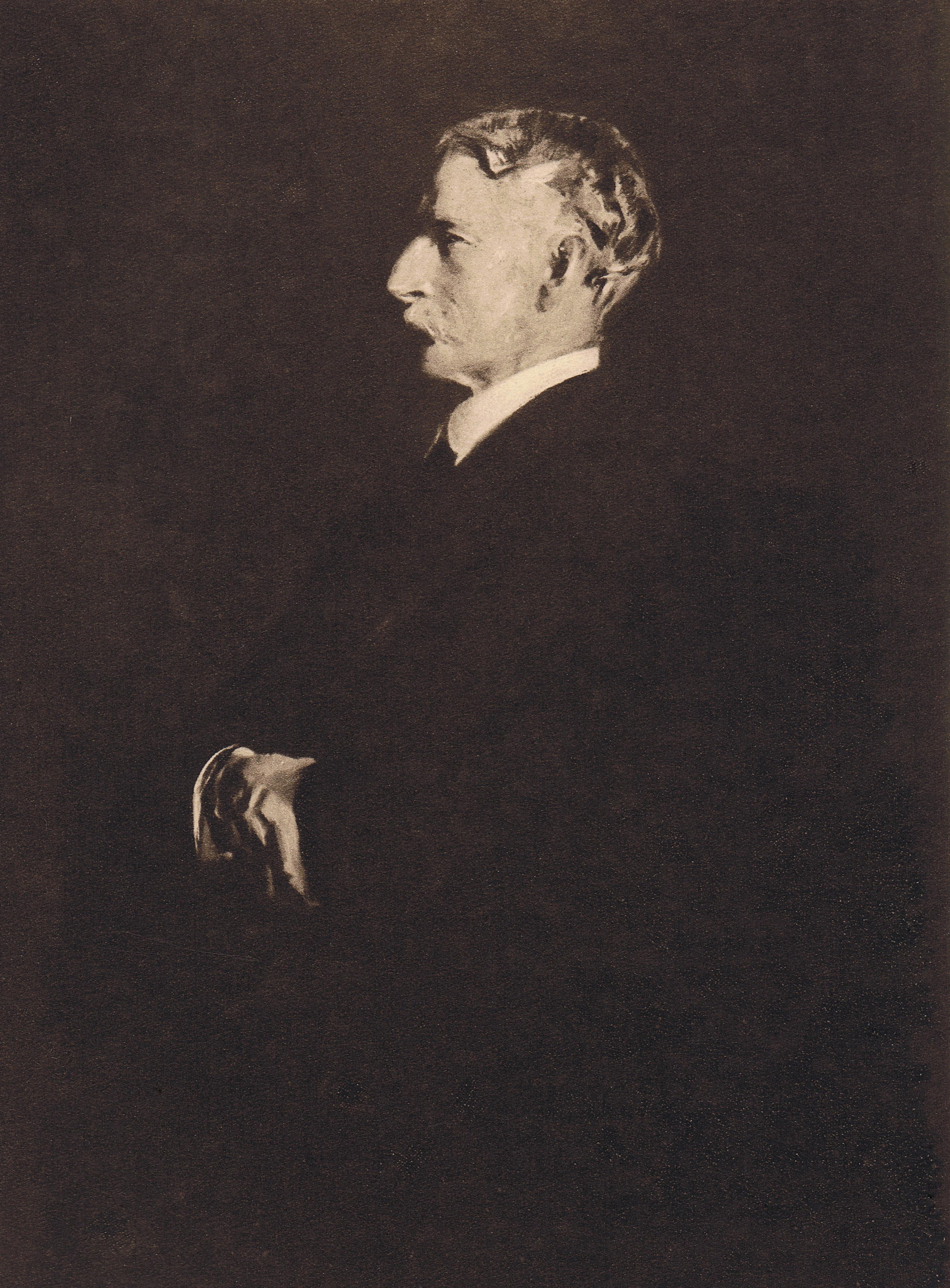
Portrait of Edward Hornor Coates, 10th President P.A.F.A., a 1912 portrait of Edward Hornor Coates by John McLure Hamilton

=== Directors ===
- John Neagle, director, 1830–1831
- Peter F. Rothermel, director, 1847–1855
- Fairman Rogers, director, 1878–1883
- Charles Henry Hart, director, 1882–1902
- Harrison S. Morris, director, 1882–1905
- George Dunton Widener
- Thomas N. Armstrong III, director, 1971–1974
- John Heman Converse

=== Presidents ===
- Henry D. Gilpin, president, 1852–1859
- Edward Hornor Coates, president, 1890–1906
- Edward T. Lewis, president, 2007–2009
- David R. Brigham, president, 2010–2020
- Eric Pryor, president, 2022–present; the school's first Black president

== See also ==
- Beck Gold Medal
- Cresson Traveling Scholarship
- Temple Gold Medal
- Widener Gold Medal
