= Foreword =

Introductory section of a book

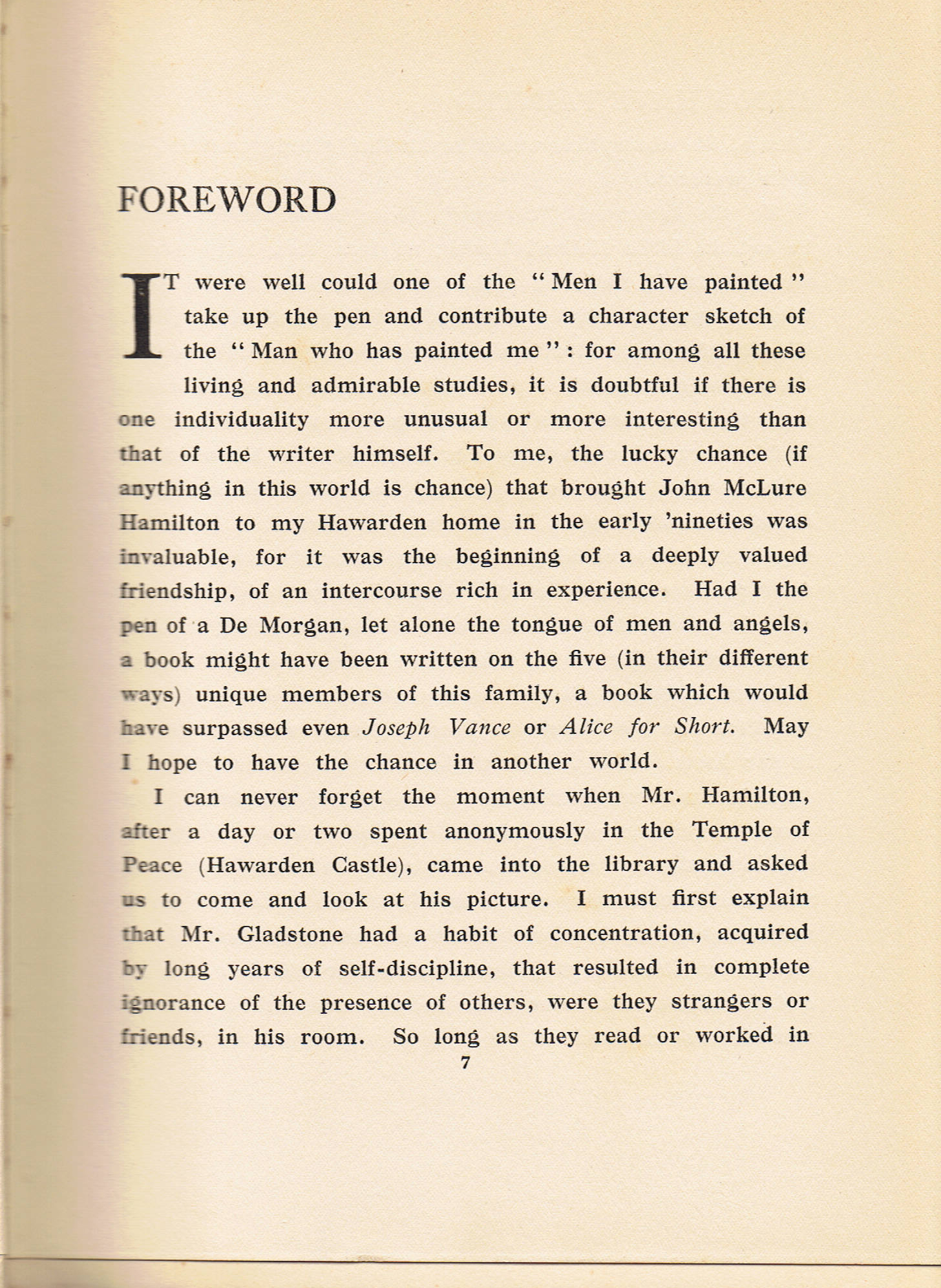
The foreword to Men I Have Painted, by John McLure Hamilton; 1921

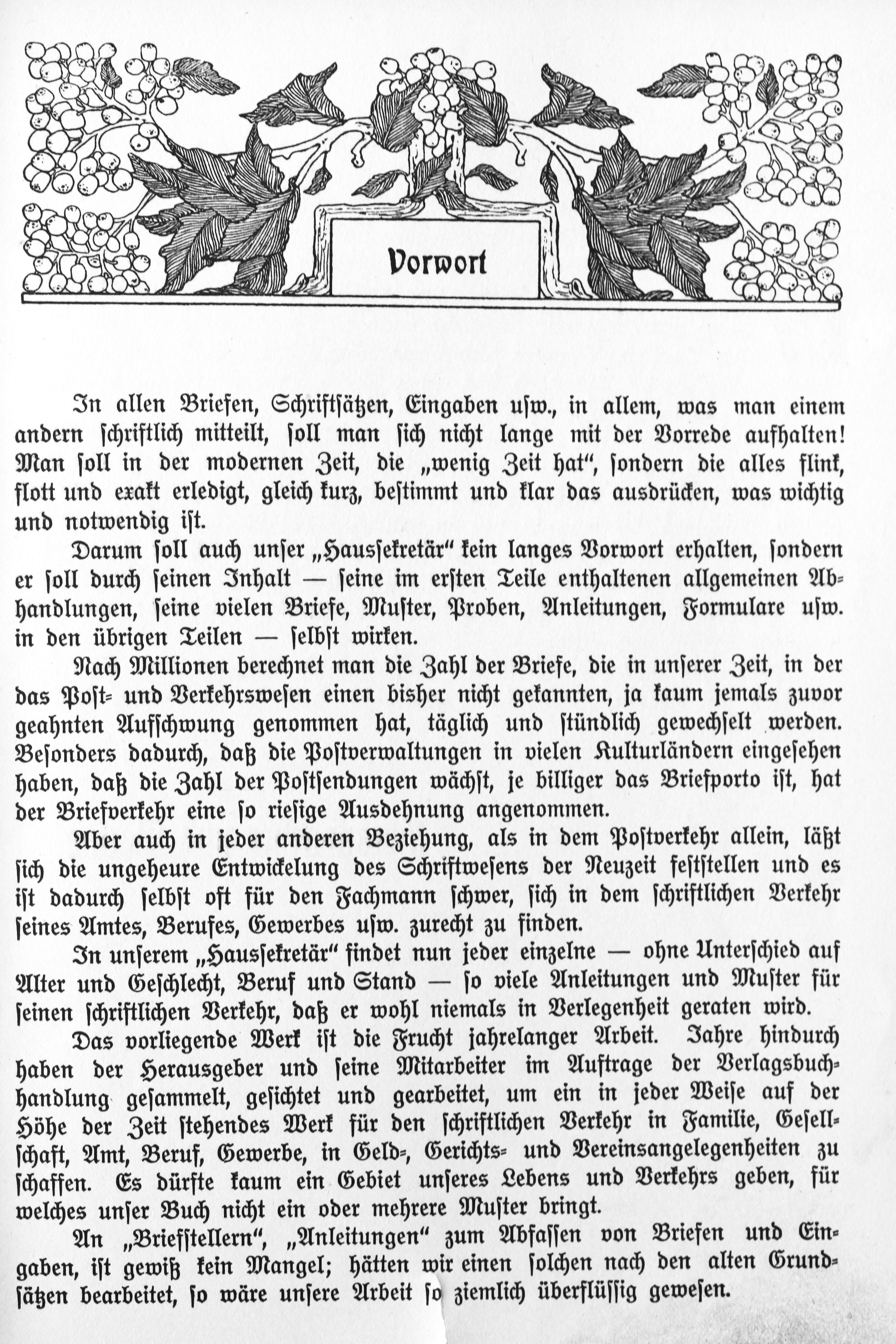
Foreword, to a 1900 book in German

A foreword is a short piece of writing that appears at the beginning of a book or another literary work. A foreword is generally written by someone other than the author and frequently offers commentary on the story or some interaction between the writer of the foreword and the primary author of the work. In some cases, a new preface is prepended (appearing before an existing foreword) in later editions of a book, which may explain revisions or differences from earlier ones.

When written by the author, such an introductory piece may describe the writing process and context behind the work and may include acknowledgements. However, unlike a preface, a foreword is conventionally signed and is usually attributed to a contributor distinct from the main author. Information essential to understanding the main text is generally presented in a set of explanatory notes, or perhaps in an introduction, rather than in the foreword or the preface.

As part of the front matter, the foreword appears before the main body of the text. Pages in this section are typically numbered separately from the main text, often using lowercase Roman numerals, while the main body of the work uses Arabic numerals. When both a foreword and a preface are included, the foreword usually appears first, followed by the preface and then the introduction, which may be paginated either with the front matter or the main text.

The word foreword was first used around the mid-17th century, originally as a term employed in philology, possibly a calque of the German Vorwort, itself derived of the Latin praefatio.

== See also ==
- Afterword
- Epigraph
- Introduction
- Preface
- Prologue
