= Philip Wharton =

Philip Wharton may refer to:

- Philip Wharton, 3rd Baron Wharton (1555–1625), English nobleman
- Philip Wharton, 4th Baron Wharton (1613–1696), English nobleman and parliamentarian
- Philip Wharton, 1st Duke of Wharton (1698–1731), English nobleman, Jacobite politician
- Philip Fishbourne Wharton (1841–1880), American artist
