= Uncle Jim =

Uncle Jim may refer to:

- James Remsen (1811–1887), an American landowner and developer
- James Turner (fictional character), a character from the Swallows and Amazons book series
- "Uncle Jim", a song by Black 47 from their 2004 album Elvis Murphy's Green Suede Shoes
- "Uncle Jim", a work of art by Philip Fishbourne Wharton
- Uncle Jim Trail, a hiking trail in Grand Canyon National Park
- Uncle Jim's Question Bee, an American radio quiz program
- "Uncle Jim and Tad and Tim" (or "Uncle Jim and Tim"), a comic strip by Clare Victor Dwiggins
- Wong Jim (1941–2004), a Cantopop lyricist and writer
