= James Smithson Medal =

The James Smithson Medal, established in 1965, is awarded to those who have made "exceptional contributions to art, science, history, education and technology." It is presented by the Smithsonian Institution which states that it is the organization's "most prestigious and highest award."

== Recipients ==
Year of award	Image	Recipient	Notes	Ref(s)
1965	Howard Florey in 1945	Howard Florey		
1968	–	Edgar Preston Richardson		
1976	Elizabeth II in 2015	Elizabeth II		
1976	–	Nancy Hanks		
1979	John Paul II in 1993	Pope John Paul II		
1986	Warren E. Burger in 2007	Warren E. Burger		
1991	Julie Johnson Kidd	Julie Johnson Kidd		
1994	Robert McCormick Adams	Robert McCormick Adams Jr.		
1999	Ira Michael Heyman	Ira Michael Heyman		
2002		David Baker		
2015	G. Wayne Clough in 2008	G. Wayne Clough		
2019	Warren Winiarski Smithson medal 2019	Warren Winiarski		
