= Seymour Remenick =

American painter, educator (1923–1999)

Seymour Remenick (1923 – December 15, 1999) was an American visual artist and teacher, mostly known for landscape paintings, but who also painted a variety of other subjects.

== Early life and education ==
Seymour Remenick was born in 1923, in Detroit, Michigan. Remenick studied at the Tyler School of Art in Philadelphia, from 1940 to 1942; the Hans Hofmann School in New York City, from 1946 to 1948; and the Pennsylvania Academy of the Fine Arts (PAFA) in Philadelphia.

== Career ==
Remenick's work has been exhibited at a number of venues, including the Philadelphia Museum of Art, the Pennsylvania Academy of Fine Arts, the Philadelphia School of Painting, the Terenchin gallery in Hudson, New York and the Davis Galleries in New York City.

He later taught at Pennsylvania Academy of the Fine Arts in Philadelphia, from 1977 to 1996. As a teacher at PAFA, he served as mentor to Christine Lafuente, Giovanni Casadei, Robert Dye, and others.

His paintings have also been auctioned at Christie's, New York. In 2010, the Lancaster Museum of Art held a posthumous exhibition of his works. His paintings have been cataloged by the Smithsonian American Art Museum.

Among the awards he received were a 1955 Louis Comfort Tiffany Foundation Grant, the 1960 Altman Landscape Prize from the National Academy of Design (NAD), and a 1960 Hallmark Purchase Award from Hallmark Cards. The NAD elected Remenick an associate member in 1980, and an academician in 1982.

== Personal life ==
Remenick married Diane K. Thommen (1931–2014) in 1950, and they had two children, Richard and Catherine.

Remenick died in 1999 in Philadelphia.

== See also ==
- List of American artists
- List of painters
- List of people from Detroit
- List of people from Philadelphia
