= Elizabeth Osborne =

American painter (born 1936)

- Born: June 5, 1936 (age 90); Philadelphia, Pennsylvania, United States
- Education: Pennsylvania Academy of the Fine Arts, University of Pennsylvania
- Known for: Oil painter, watercolorist
- Movement: Figurative painting, abstract painting
- Awards: Fulbright Scholar, Richard and Hinda Rosenthal Foundation Award from the American Academy and Institute of Arts and Letters, PAFA Distinguished Alumni Award, Ford Foundation Purchase Prize, MacDowell Colony Grant
- Website: elizabethosborne.us/paintings.html

Elizabeth Osborne (born 1936) is an American painter and teacher, who lives in Philadelphia. Working primarily in oil paint and watercolor, her paintings are known to bridge ideas about formalist concerns, particularly luminosity with her explorations of nature, atmosphere and vistas. Beginning with figurative paintings in the 1960s and '70s, she moved on to bold, color drenched, landscapes and eventually abstractions that explore color spectrums. Her experimental assemblage paintings that incorporated objects began an inquiry into psychological content that she continued in a series of self-portraits and a long-running series of solitary female nudes and portraits. Osborne's later abstract paintings present a culmination of ideas—distilling her study of luminosity, the landscape, and light.

== Career ==
Elizabeth Osborne was born in 1936, in Philadelphia, Pennsylvania.

"Black Doorway I" (1966) by Osborne; it was exhibited as "Woman in Doorway" in early 1966. Photo taken at the Delaware Art Museum in 2017.

Osborne attended classes at the Pennsylvania Academy of the Fine Arts (PAFA), and graduated from the University of Pennsylvania in 1959 for her undergraduate studies. After graduation Osborne was awarded a Fulbright Scholarship and traveled to Paris to study art for a year.

In 1963, she became the third woman to join the faculty at PAFA and for many years was the sole female faculty member. She retired from teaching at PAFA in 2011. In 2008, she was honored with a career survey exhibition at the museum of the Pennsylvania Academy of Fine Arts organized by curator Robert Cozzolino, bringing together works from all periods of her career and accompanied by a major monograph publication. Osborne currently lives and works in Philadelphia and is represented by Locks Gallery.

Her work is in numerous public collections including the Philadelphia Museum of Art, the Pennsylvania Academy of the Fine Arts, the McNay Art Museum, the Reading Art Museum, the Delaware Art Museum, the Woodmere Art Museum, and the Palmer Museum of Art.

== Exhibitions ==
- "Elizabeth Osborne: The Sixties" (October 8, 2016 - January 8, 2017) the Delaware Art Museum
- "Veils of Color: Juxtapositions and Recent Work by Elizabeth Osborne" (July 25 – November 15, 2015) the James A. Michener Art Museum
- "The Artist in the Garden" (2015), James A. Michener Art Museum
- "Luminous Gestures" (2013), Locks Gallery, solo exhibition
- "The Color of Light" (2012), the Pennsylvania Academy of Fine Arts solo career-survey curated by Robert Cozzolino with accompanying monograph publication
- "The Female Gaze: Women Artists Making Their World", (2012) The Linda Lee Alter Collection of Art by Women, Pennsylvania Academy of the Fine Arts
- "Flirting with Abstraction," (2012) Woodmere Art Museum
- "Narcissus in the Studio: Portraits and Self Portraits" (2011) the Pennsylvania Academy of the Fine Arts
- Elizabeth Osborne: Floating Landscapes 1971-79 (2006) Locks Gallery, Philadelphia, solo exhibition
- "Elizabeth Osborne: Recent Prints", (2005) solo exhibition at the Print Center in Philadelphia
- Four Visions/Four Painters: Murray Dessner, Bruce Samuelson, Elizabeth Osborne and Vincent Desiderio (2004) Philip and Muriel Berman Museum of Art,
- "The Modern Still Life: Drawings, Watercolors, and Collages from the Collection" (1992), Philadelphia Museum of Art
- "Elizabeth Osborne: Paintings and Watercolors" (1976) solo exhibition at Marian Locks Gallery, Philadelphia

== Recognition ==
In 2013, Osborne received the Distinguished Alumni Award from the Pennsylvania Academy of Fine Arts. In 1968, she received a prestigious Rosenthal Award from the National Institute of Arts and Letters and in 1964 was a Fulbright Scholar in Paris, France.
