= Louise Pershing =

American painter, sculptor (1904–1986)

- Born: May 24, 1904; Pittsburgh, Pennsylvania, United States
- Died: October 24, 1986 (aged 82); Pittsburgh, Pennsylvania, United States
- Other name: Louise Pershing Berlin
- Education: Pennsylvania Academy of the Fine Arts, Carnegie Institute of Technology, University of Pittsburgh
- Relatives: Gen. John J. Pershing (cousin)

Louise Pershing (May 24, 1904 – October 14, 1986) was an American painter, sculptor, and designer. She was a founder of the Pittsburgh Center for the Arts. Pershing lived in the Shadyside neighborhood of Pittsburgh, and spent her summers in Provincetown, Massachusetts. She also went by the names Louise Pershing Murdoch, and Louise Pershing Berlin.

== Career ==
Louise Pershing was born on May 24, 1904, in Pittsburgh, Pennsylvania. She graduated from the Knox School for Girls in Cooperstown, New York.

She continued her studies at the Pennsylvania Academy of the Fine Arts; followed by the Carnegie Institute of Technology (now Carnegie Mellon University), and the University of Pittsburgh. She worked under Hans Hofman, and while at the Carnegie Institute she worked under Giovanni Romagnoli and Alexander Kostellow.

== Exhibitions ==
Pershing exhibited extensively, beginning in 1927 with the Associated Artists of Pittsburgh. One of her paintings, "Seedlings," was included in the 1937 Carnegie International, and her work was also part of the 1949 and 1950 Internationals.

She also had several solo exhibitions. Exhibition of Paintings by Louise Pershing appeared at the Carnegie Institute between March 19-April 26, 1942.

== Awards ==
Pershing's painting, Coal Tipple earned the Margaret Cooper Prize at the 45th Annual Exhibition of the National Association of Women Painters and Sculptors in 1936.
