= Constance Coleman Richardson =

American painter

- Born: 1905; Berlin, Germany
- Died: 2002 (aged 96–97); Philadelphia, Pennsylvania, U.S.
- Notable work: Streetlight (1930)
- Movement: American Scene
- Spouse: Edgar Preston Richardson (m. 1931; died 1985)

Constance Coleman Richardson (1905–2002) was an American painter best known for her American Scene landscapes and interplay of light on figures, evocative of Edward Hopper. She attended Vassar College and Pennsylvania Academy of the Fine Arts and was married to art historian and museum director Edgar Preston Richardson from 1931 until his death in 1985.

== Biography ==
Daughter of Christopher B. Coleman, secretary of the Indiana Historical Society and professor of history at Butler College, Richardson was born in Berlin and grew up in the Irvington neighborhood of Indianapolis. She graduated from Laurel School in Shaker Heights, Ohio, and attended Vassar College for two years before transferring to the Pennsylvania Academy of the Fine Arts, where she studied from 1925 until 1928. It was there that she met her future husband, Edgar Preston Richardson, a student of painting who later became an art historian and museum director.

From 1928 to 1930, Richardson lived in Indianapolis. Constance lived in Detroit from 1931 to 1962 while Edgar worked at Detroit Institute of Arts, where he served as assistant director from 1933 to 1945, and as director from 1945 to 1962.

Her first landscapes date to the summers the couple spent in Vermont and New York; she later worked along the Great Lakes before discovering the West, and many of her later works were painted in Wyoming. She exhibited widely and received numerous prizes.

Richardson relocated with her husband to Delaware in 1962 when he became director of the Winterthur Museum.

In 1985, she was living in Philadelphia. Many of her paintings are concerned with the effects of light on the figure and on the landscape. She also painted portraits and genre scenes in addition to landscapes; her work has been described as reminiscent of Edward Hopper.

Richardson's 1930 painting Street Light, owned by the Indianapolis Museum of Art, was included in the inaugural exhibition of the National Museum of Women in the Arts, American Women Artists 1830–1930, in 1987. As of February 10, 2017, the Indianapolis Museum of Art owns three works by Richardson. The painting Fourth of July is owned by the Pennsylvania Academy of the Fine Arts. As of July 20, 2020, the Detroit Institute of Arts owns six of her works. Letters between Richardson and her husband are currently held by the Archives of American Art.
