= Edgar Preston Richardson =

American art historian and museum director (1902–1985)

- Richardson in 1968
- Born: December 2, 1902; Glens Falls, New York, US
- Died: March 27, 1985 (aged 82); Philadelphia, US
- Other name: E. P. Richardson
- Education: Williams College (BA, 1925); Philadelphia Academy of Fine Arts
- Occupations: Art historian; museum director; author; curator
- Employer(s): Detroit Institute of Arts; Winterthur Museum
- Board member of: Pennsylvania Academy of the Fine Arts, Historical Society of Pennsylvania, Library Company of Philadelphia, National Portrait Gallery, Smithsonian Arts Commission
- Spouse: Constance Coleman Richardson (married 1931)
- Awards: James Smithson Medal (1968)

Edgar Preston Richardson (December 2, 1902 – March 27, 1985), also known as E. P. Richardson, was an American art historian, museum director, author, and curator. Richardson served as director of the Detroit Institute of Arts (1945–1962) and Winterthur Museum (1963–1966). He authored seven books, served on the boards of the Pennsylvania Academy of the Fine Arts (1966–1977) and other arts organizations, and co-founded the Archives of American Art at the Smithsonian in 1954.

== Life and career ==
Richardson was born in Glens Falls, New York. He earned his BA with highest honors from Williams College in 1925 and went on to study painting for three years at the Pennsylvania Academy of the Fine Arts. He joined the Detroit Institute of Arts in 1930 as educational secretary, gained a promotion to assistant director in 1933, and worked as director from 1945 to 1962, growing the museum's American art collection into one of the top five in the country according to the Detroit Free Press. Also while at Detroit, he co-founded the Archives of American Art with Kennedy Galleries director Lawrence Fleischman and became the Archives' first director. He left Detroit to become director of Winterthur Museum, Garden and Library in 1962 before retiring in 1966. He then served as president of the Pennsylvania Academy of the Fine Arts from 1968 to 1970.

In 1968, Richardson received the James Smithson Medal, the Smithsonian Institution's self-described "most prestigious and highest award." Other honors included Chevalier of the French Legion of Honour, Chevalier of the Belgian Order of Leopold, and honorary degrees from Union College, Université Laval, the University of Delaware, the University of Pennsylvania, Wayne State University, and Williams College, A Benjamin Franklin Fellow of the Royal Society of Arts, Richardson also belonged to the American Philosophical Society, the Century Association, the Franklin Inn Club of Philadelphia, and Phi Beta Kappa.

For more than a decade, Richardson advised collector and philanthropist John D. Rockefeller III, who bequeathed his vast art collection to the Fine Arts Museums of San Francisco. Richardson served on the editorial boards of Art in America, Magazine of Art, and the Pennsylvania Magazine of History and Biography and edited Art Quarterly from 1938 to 1967. He served on the boards of directors of the Historical Society of Pennsylvania, the Library Company of Philadelphia, the National Portrait Gallery, the Pennsylvania Academy of the Fine Arts, the Smithsonian Arts Commission, and other arts organizations.

== Personal life ==
Richardson married painter Constance Coleman Richardson (1905–2002) in 1931. They met while attending the Pennsylvania Academy of the Fine Arts during the 1920s. The Richardsons had no children. Edgar Preston Richardson died in Roxborough, Philadelphia, on March 27, 1985, at the age of 82. Detroit Free Press lauded him as "the dean of American art historians throughout the country," a "shy and scholarly director, much more comfortable doing research than at social gatherings."

The E. P. and Constance Richardson Papers are held in the permanent collections of the Archives of American Art. Additional materials are held at the Detroit Institute of Arts and the Winterthur Library.

== Publications ==
- Richardson, E. P.; Hindle, Brooke; Miller, Lillian B. (1983). Charles Willson Peale and His World. New York: Abrams. ISBN 978-0-8109-1478-0. OCLC 892245176.
- Richardson, E. P. (1976). American Art: An Exhibition from the Collection of Mr. and Mrs. John D. Rockefeller III; A Narrative and Critical Catalogue. San Francisco: Fine Arts Museums of San Francisco. ISBN 9780884010180. OCLC 2406272 – via Internet Archive.
- Richardson, E. P. (1965). Painting in America from 1502 to the Present. New York: Crowell. ISBN 978-0-690-60880-9. OCLC 517571.
- Richardson, E. P. (1963). A Short History of Painting in America: The Story of 450 Years. New York: Crowell. ISBN 978-0-690-73377-8. OCLC 906706300.
- Richardson, E. P. (1948). Washington Allston: A Study of the Romantic Artist in America. Chicago: University of Chicago Press. OCLC 1082517.
- Richardson, E. P. (1944). American Romantic Painting. New York: E. Weyhe. OCLC 501305252.
- Richardson, E. P. (1939). The Way of Western Art, 1776–1914. Cambridge, MA: Harvard University Press. ISBN 978-0-674-42909-3. OCLC 889468.
