= Frank Knox Morton Rehn =

American painter

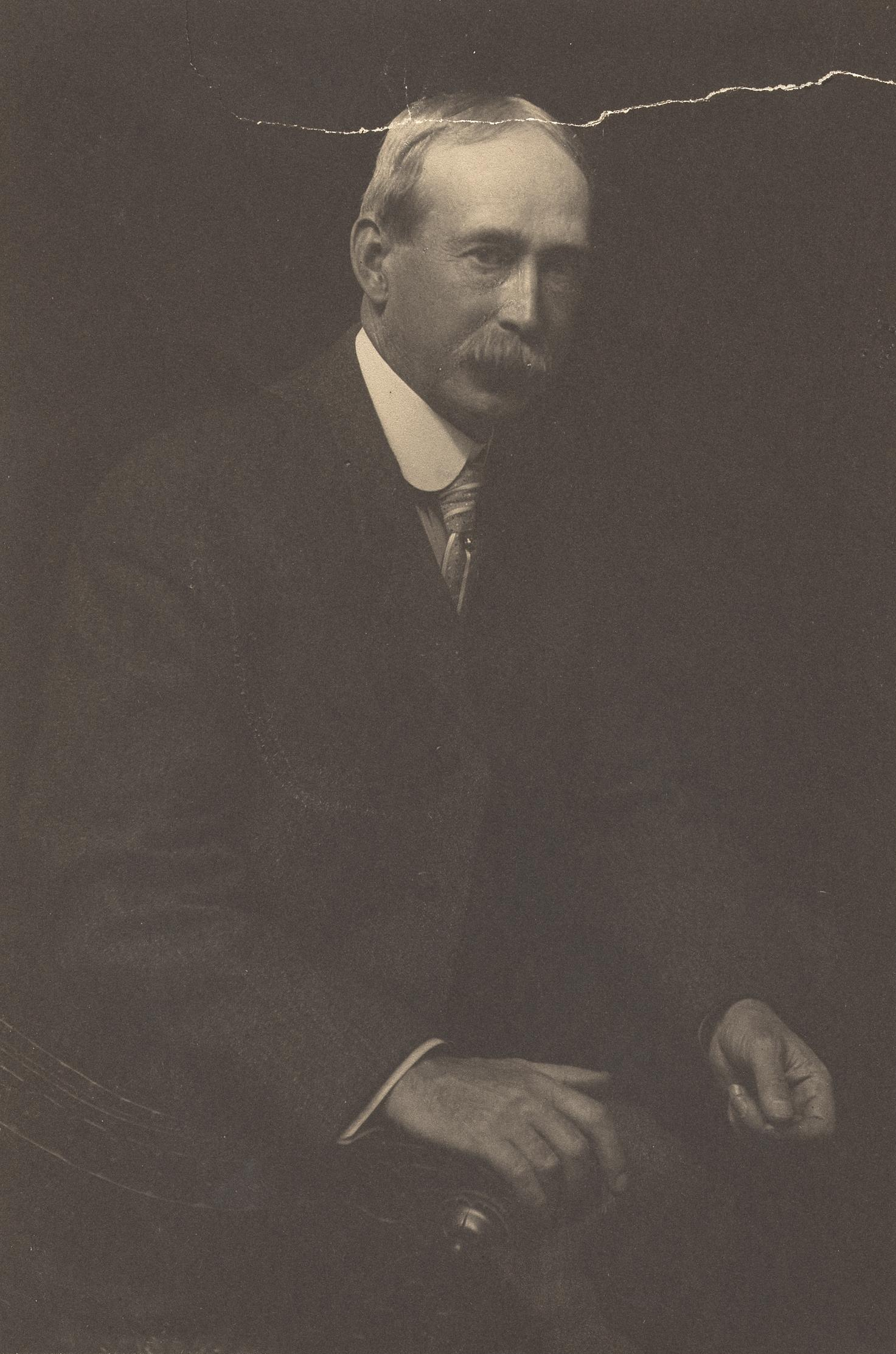
- F. K. M. Rehn
- Born: April 12, 1848; Philadelphia, Pennsylvania, United States
- Died: July 7, 1914 (aged 66); Magnolia, Massachusetts, United States
- Known for: Marine painting
- Spouse: Margaret Selby
- Children: Frank Knox Morton Rehn (1886–1956)
- Awards: First prize for marine painting at the St. Louis Exposition (1882), Gold medal at the Prize Fund Exhibition (1886)

Frank Knox Morton Rehn (April 12, 1848 – July 7, 1914) was an American marine painter, and president of the Salmagundi Club.

== Biography ==
Born in Philadelphia, he attended the Pennsylvania Academy of the Fine Arts, where he studied under Christian Schussele. For several years, he then painted portraits in Philadelphia. Using money earned in Philadelphia, he moved to the coast of New Jersey, where he began doing marine paintings. In 1881, he married Margaret Selby. They moved to the Hotel Chelsea in New York City where, with other artists, he kept a studio on the top floor.

In 1882, he was awarded the first prize for marine painting at the St. Louis Exposition. In 1885, he received the first prize at the water color exhibition of the American Art Association, and in 1886 he won a gold medal at the Prize Fund Exhibition.

Rehn died on July 7, 1914, in Magnolia, Massachusetts, where he had built a summer home in 1896. A son, also named Frank Knox Morton Rehn (1886–1956), owned a well-known Manhattan art gallery; among the artists he represented was Edward Hopper.

== Works ==
- "Looking down on the Sea from the Rocks at Magnolia, Mass." (1884–85)
- "A Missing Vessel" (Detroit Institute of Arts; 1885)
- "Close of a Summer Day" (Buffalo Fine Arts Academy; 1887)
- "Evening, Gloucester Harbor" (1887)
- "In the Glittering Moonlight" (Corcoran Gallery)
