= Christine Lafuente =

American painter (born 1968)

Christine Lafuente (born 1968) is an American painter. She is best known for her still lives and landscapes, painted alla prima (in one sitting), in an energized, loose, wet-into-wet style. As a plein aire landscape painter, Lafuente's primary areas of focus are cityscapes and seascapes. She born in Poughkeepsie, New York, and now lives in Brooklyn.

== Education ==
Lafuente holds an MFA degree from Brooklyn College, a CFA degree from the Pennsylvania Academy of the Fine Arts, and a BA degree from Bryn Mawr College. When at Brooklyn College, she studied painting with Lennart Anderson.

== Work ==
Lafuente's work is characterized by an interest in color and light, and by a blurriness of edges. It has been noted that the forms in her paintings "seem to merge and dissolve together". Lafuente has said of her work, "I have discovered the act of seeing to be itself an aesthetic or poetic act."

== Exhibitions ==
Lafuente has exhibited extensively in the US and abroad. She has had thirty five solo shows, at venues including the Somerville Manning Gallery in Delaware, Gross McCleaf Gallery in Philadelphia, Morpeth Contemporary Gallery in Hopewell, NJ, Frost and Reed Gallery in London, Cantor Fitzgerald Gallery at Haverford College, and Fleisher Art Memorial, Philadelphia. She has participated in many group shows, including at the American Academy of Arts and Letters, New York, NY, the Woodmere Art Museum, Philadelphia, the Pennsylvania Academy of the Fine Arts, and the Delaware Art Museum.

== Awards ==
Lafuente has received numerous awards, notably a Philadelphia Sketch Club Medal for Achievement in Visual Arts, an Adolf and Esther Gottlieb Foundation Grant, and a Stobart Foundation Grant. She has received two Full Fellowships from the Vermont Studio Center, and was an Artist in Residence at the Fleisher Art Memorial from 1997 to 2002.
