= Philip Fishbourne Wharton =

American painter

Philip Fishbourne Wharton (April 30, 1841 – July 20, 1880) was an American visual artist, known for his watercolors and oil paintings.

Wharton was born in Philadelphia, Pennsylvania, the son of Fishbourne Wharton (1778–1846), merchant, and his second wife Mary Ann Shoemaker, and the grandson of Governor Thomas Wharton Jr. He studied at the Pennsylvania Academy of Fine Arts, and later in Paris and Dresden. His best-known pictures are "Perdita", which received a medal at the Centennial Exposition of 1876, "Eventide", "Uncle Jim", "Over the Hills and Far Away" and " Waiting for the Parade". He also painted many watercolors, chiefly scenes in Florida and Nassau. His 1876 portrait of James Wilson hangs in Independence National Historical Park.

He died, unmarried, in Media, Pennsylvania, on July 20, 1880.
