= Linda Lee Alter =

American visual artist (born 1939)

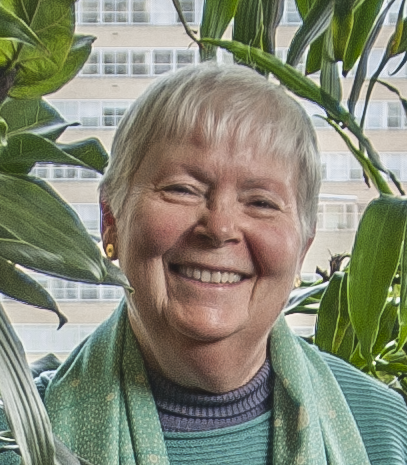
- Born: 1939 (age 86–87); Philadelphia, Pennsylvania, U.S.
- Education: Philadelphia College of Art
- Website: www.lindaleealter.com

Linda Lee Alter (born 1939) is an American visual artist who is primarily known as an art collector and philanthropist. In 2010 Alter donated five hundred artworks by American female artists to the Pennsylvania Academy of the Fine Arts in Philadelphia, Pennsylvania.

== Life and education ==
Alter graduated from Olney High School in 1957, and from the Philadelphia College of Art in 1961. After 30 years of being a fiber artist, painting with acrylics became her medium of choice. Alter's appliqués and paintings are represented in private and public collections including: Allentown Art Museum; Anheuser Busch Company of MO and FL; Historical Society of Pennsylvania; Lehigh Valley Health System Art Collection; National Museum of American Jewish History; Pennsylvania Academy of the Fine Arts; Saint Charles Seminary; and the Woodmere Art Museum. In 2008 the Allentown Art Museum held a retrospective of Alter's artwork.

== Collecting ==
Alter made it her mission to collect art by women artists. Her intention was to donate the collection to an art museum so the general public could view and enjoy art by outstanding women artists.

In 2010, Alter donated her collection of 500 art by American female artists to the Pennsylvania Academy of Fine Arts. In 2012, the Pennsylvania Academy of Fine Arts exhibited Alter's collection in an exhibition entitled The Female Gaze: Women Artists Making Their World. Artists in this exhibition included Louise Bourgeois, Kiki Smith, Joan Brown, Elizabeth Catlett, Viola Frey, Ana Mendieta, Christina Ramberg, Beatrice Wood, Alice Neel, Faith Ringgold, Louise Nevelson, Gertrude Abercrombie, Edna Andrade, and Sue Coe, amongst many others. Chief Curator of the Pennsylvania Academy of the Fine Arts, Robert Cozzolino, edited a book entitled The Female Gaze: Women Artists Making Their World about the collection.

== Philanthropy ==
In 1993, Alter started the Leeway Foundation to support women artists, particularly those of the greater Philadelphia area. Leeway has evolved into a community-led, grant making foundation that supports women and trans artists and cultural producers working in communities at the intersection of art, culture and social change. 2018 was Leeway's 25th consecutive year of grant making. In 1997, Alter founded the Bertha Dagan Berman Award in Women's Health at the University of Pennsylvania Medical School in honor of her Aunt Bert, and to increase the focus on the health and care of women. The endowment provides several medical students each year to study aspects of general women's health.

== Recognition ==
In 2013, Linda Lee Alter received an Honorary Doctorate of the Arts from Pennsylvania Academy of the Fine Arts, Philadelphia, PA. In 2012, she won a Bebe Benoliel Founder's Award for an Outstanding Arts Contributor from Center for Emerging Visual Artists, Philadelphia, PA. In 2008, Alter won a Robin Hood Was Right Award from Bread & Roses Community Fund's Tribute to Change, Philadelphia, PA. In 1988, Alter received an Honorary Doctorate of the Arts from Moore College of Art & Design, Philadelphia, PA
