= John McLure Hamilton =

American painter

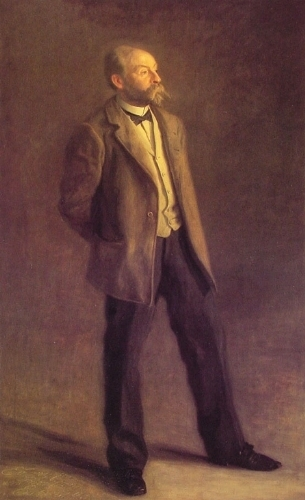
An 1895 portrait of Hamilton by Thomas Eakins

John McLure Hamilton (January 31, 1853–September 9, 1936) was an Anglo-American artist.

He was born in Philadelphia, where he began his art education at the Pennsylvania Academy of Fine Arts, under Thomas Eakins. Later he travelled to Europe and continued his education at the Ecole des Beaux Arts in Paris and at the Royal Academy in Belgium. Hamilton was noted for portraits, figure paintings and illustrations. While maintaining a permanent address in Philadelphia, he lived in England for fifty-eight years where he was official portrait painter to William Ewart Gladstone, prime minister of the United Kingdom.

In addition to Gladstone, Hamilton painted portraits of many English notables including Cardinal Manning, George Meredith and Richard Vaux. He was the author of a book, Men I Have Painted. In the book he writes of himself thus,

As I grow older the advantage of having been born an American of British and French blood becomes daily more ideal. I now know that I have escaped the insulating influences and the national prejudices of all three countries, and have retained only their qualities — mainly good.

In a review of the book, which reveals insights into some famous personalities of the time, The New York Times wrote, "... his chats about his sitters are delightfully without pretense ... if his portrait turns out a bad one, he mentions it".
'In its review of the book, the Pennsylvania Magazine of History and Biography wrote:

For Philadelphians who have known J. McLure Hamilton as a fellow townsman — even if a somewhat cosmopolitan one who dissembles his love for his native city by very rarely remaining in it for any length of time, much to the regret of his numerous friends — the dictum of Mary Drew, one of the Gladstone family, that 'it is doubtful if there is one individuality more unusual or more interesting than that of the writer himself' will be accepted as final and quite a summing up of his gossipy new book 'Men I Have Painted,' with 48 portraits. ... But, a book which deals with Bismarck, Asquith, Balfour, Manning, Tyndall, Spencer, General Booth, G. F. Watts and George Meredith, selecting a few of the more world-famous names cannot be but fascinating especially in these days of the craze for personality in biography. Here is indeed revealed the man and his manner and his method and the character of a great period in modern life as is set out by human beings who find in this singularly human being, Hamilton, the painter, a true interpreter of manners and of men."

Hamilton was a member of the American Federation of Arts, the Philadelphia Water Color Club, the Pastel Society, the Royal Society of Portrait Painters and the Senefelder Club, London. His portraits are found in the following galleries; Luxembourg Museum, Paris, (which is devoted to artists foreign to France), the National Portrait Gallery, London and the Pennsylvania Academy of Fine Arts, which awarded him its Gold Medal of Honor in 1918.

== Gallery ==
More images available at Commons.

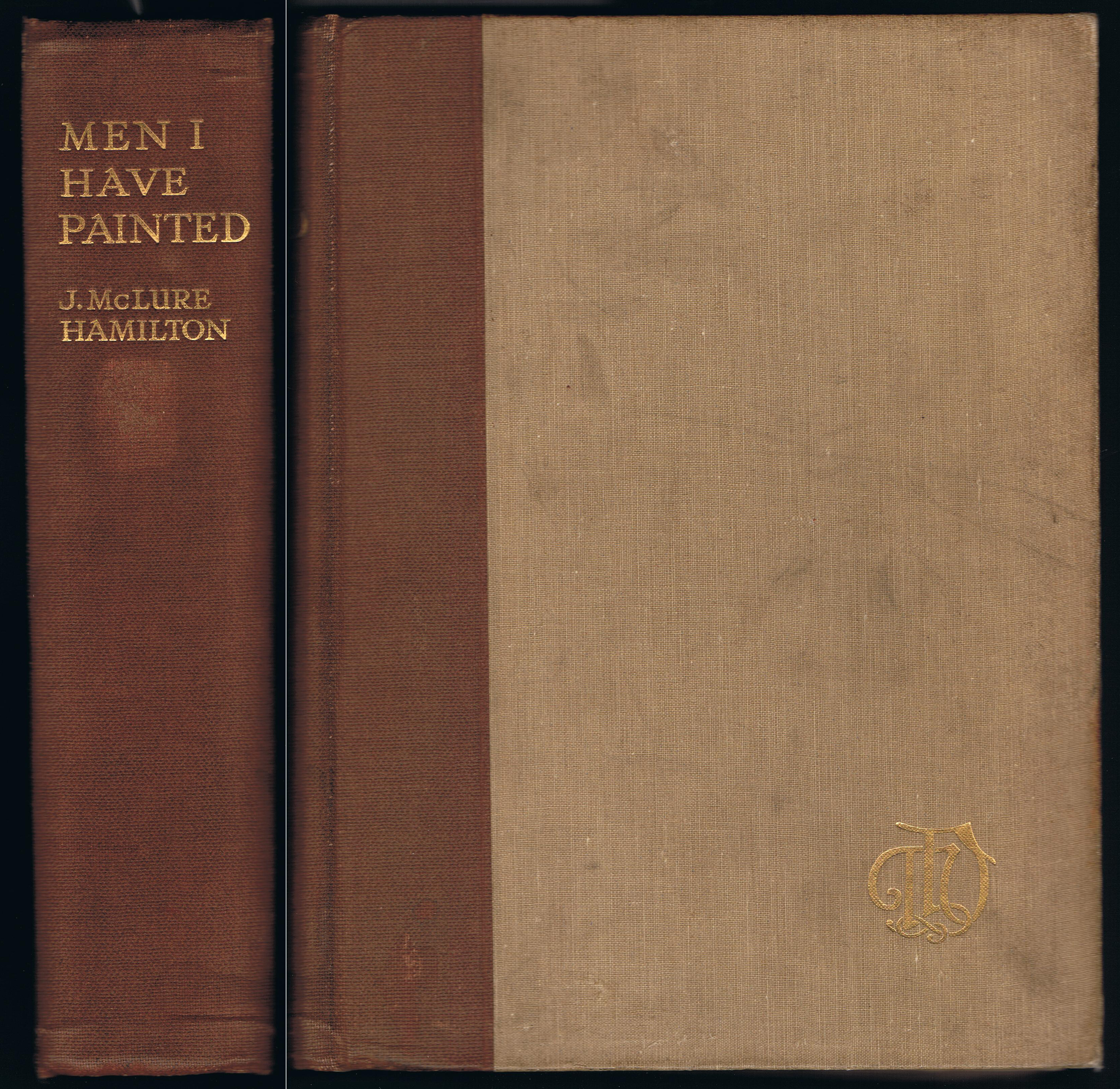
Men I Have Painted (1921) by Hamilton with 48 portraits

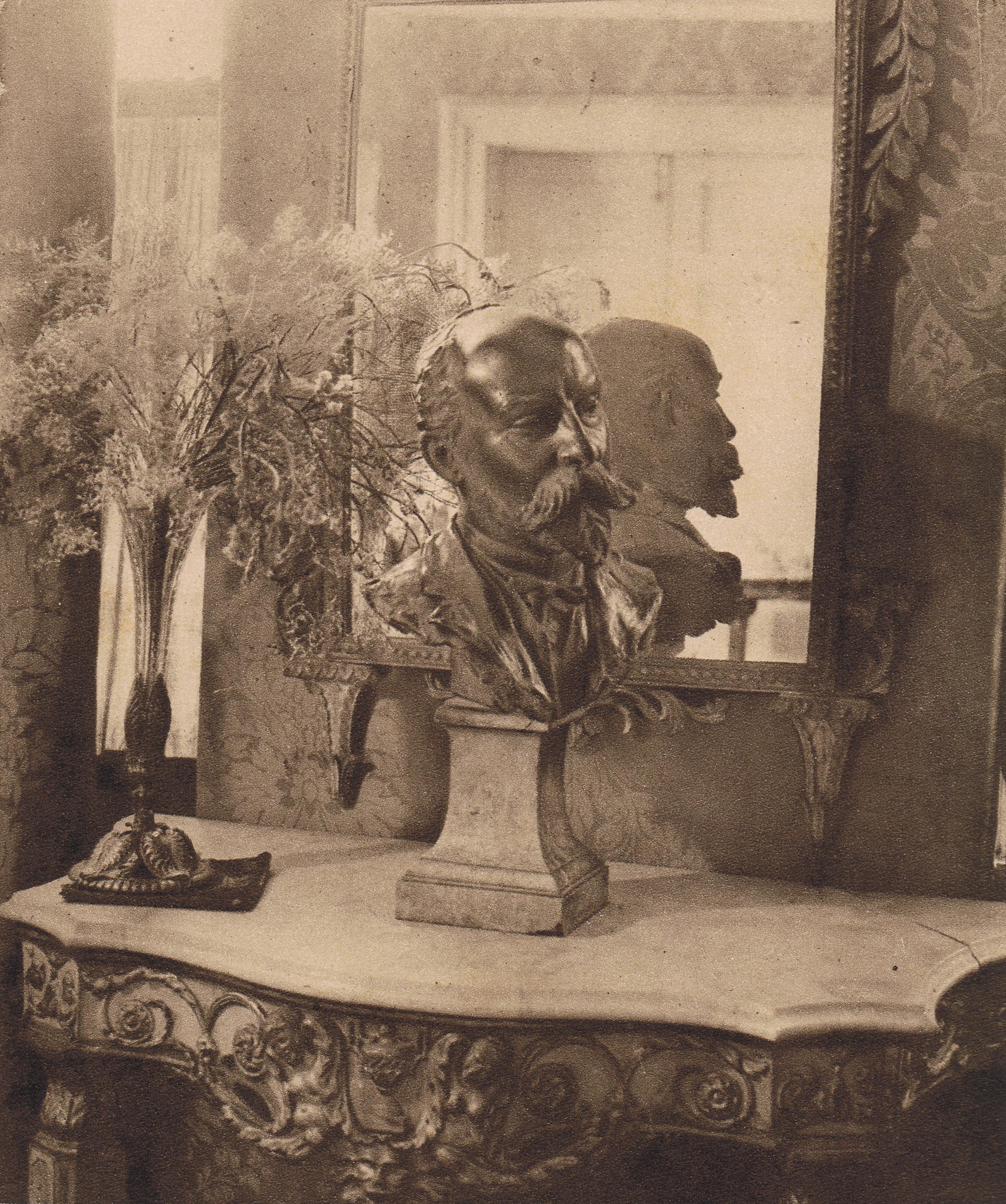
Portrait bust of Hamilton by Onslow Ford

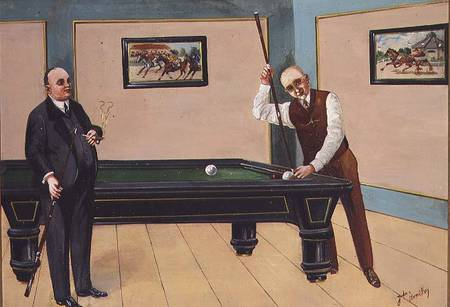
The Billiards Match

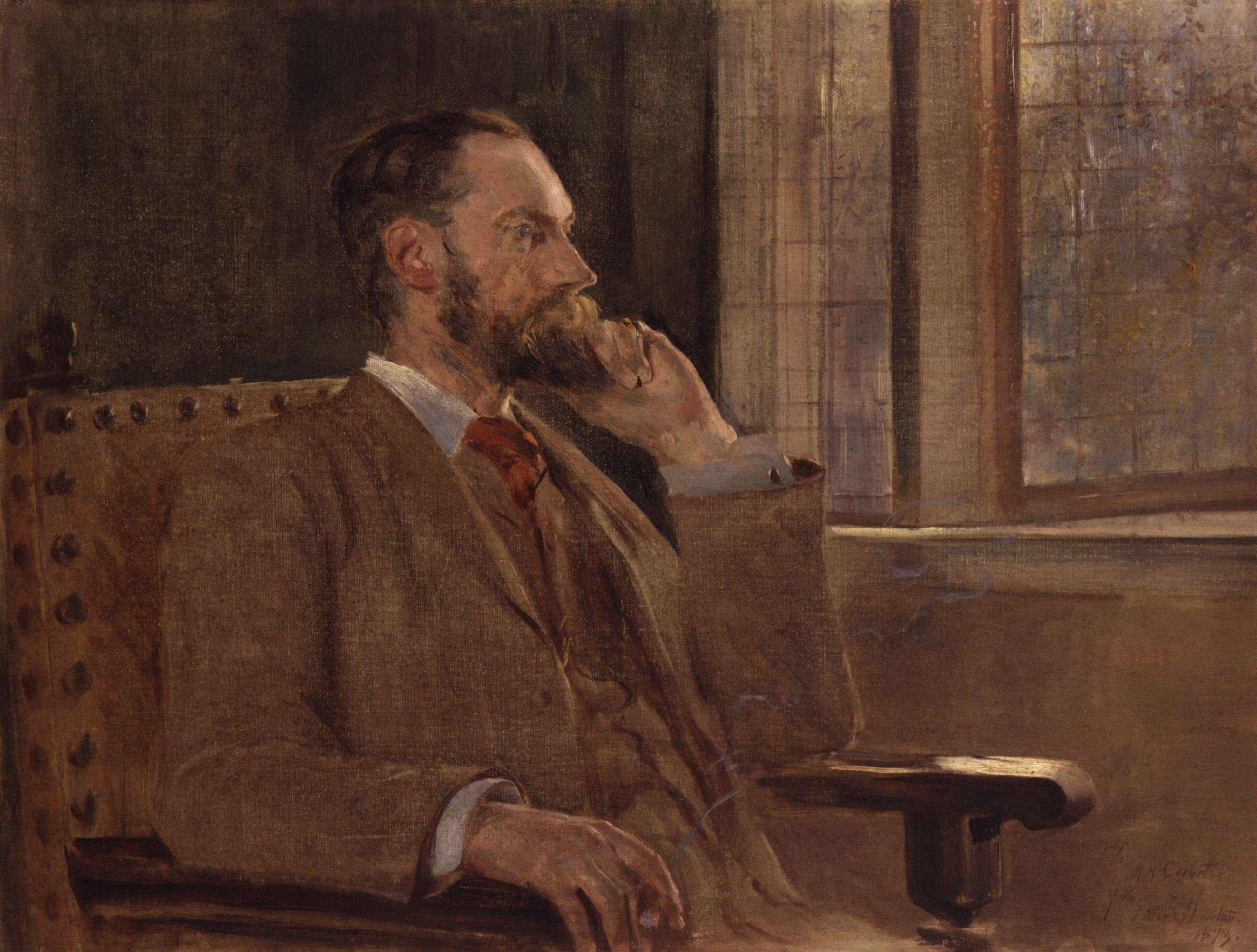
Matthew Ridley Corbet

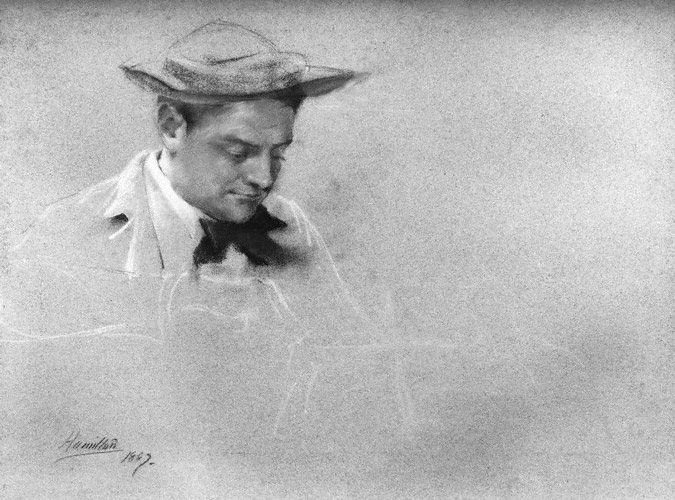
Sir Alfred Gilbert

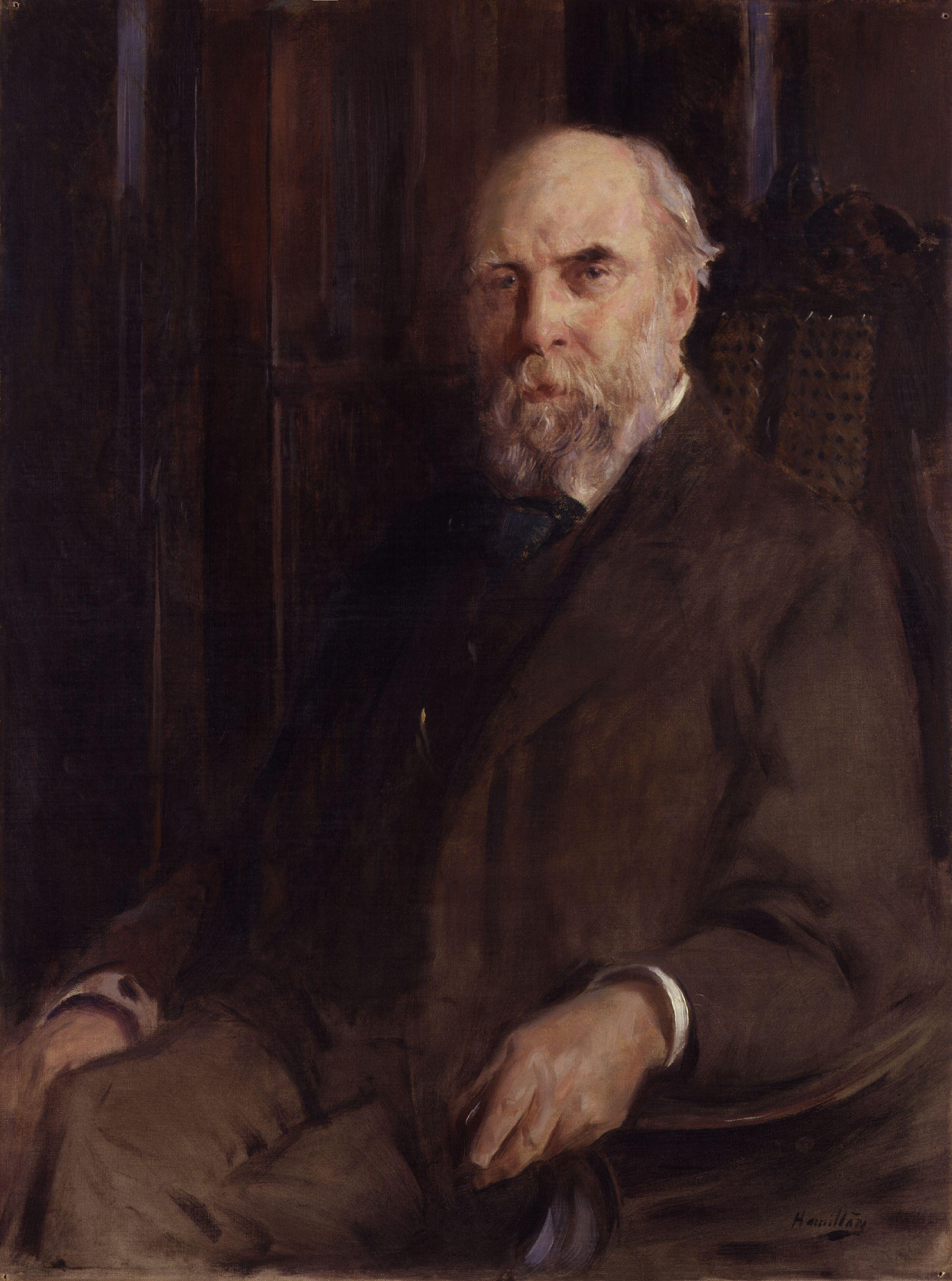
William Cosmo Monkhouse

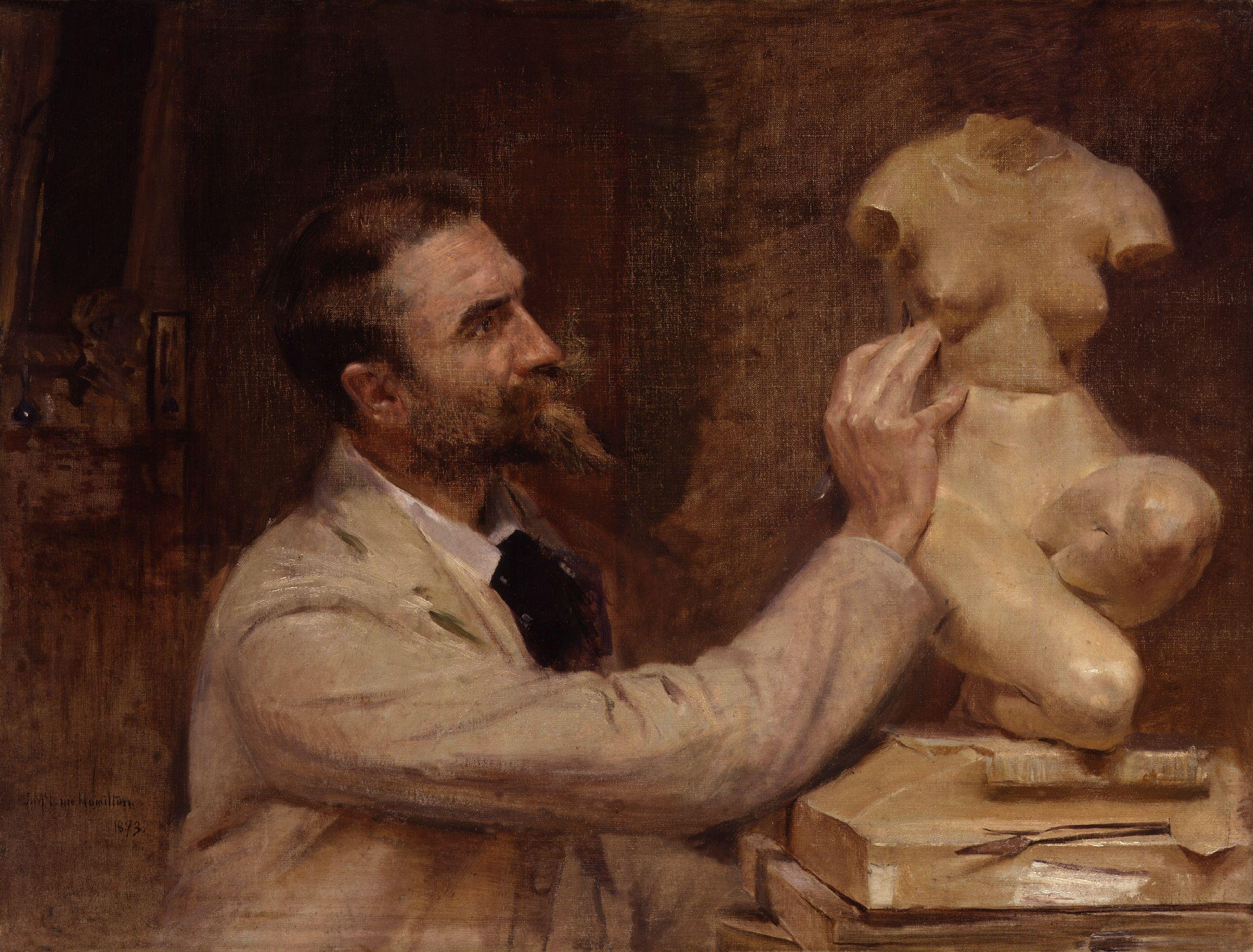
Edward Onslow Ford

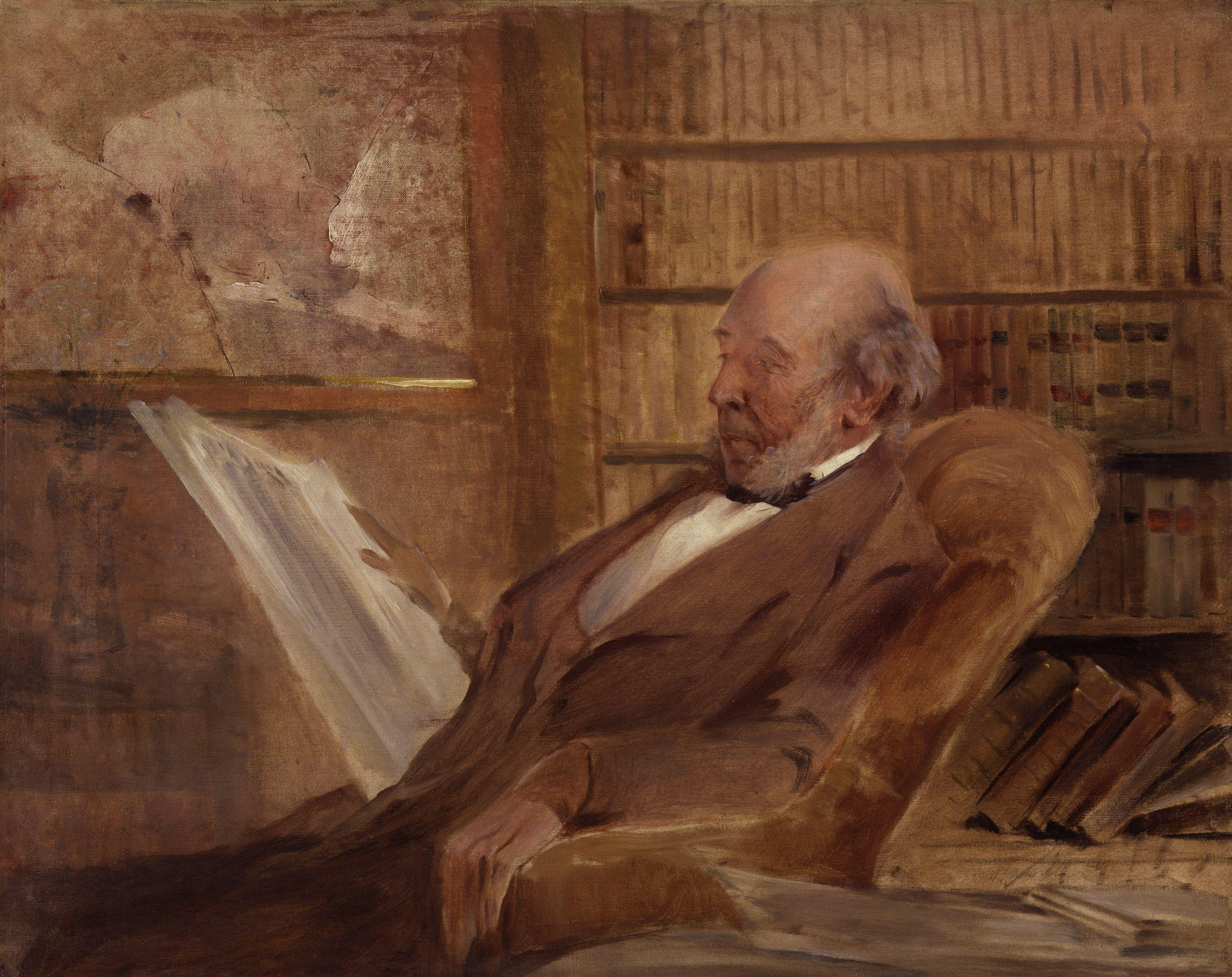
Herbert Spencer

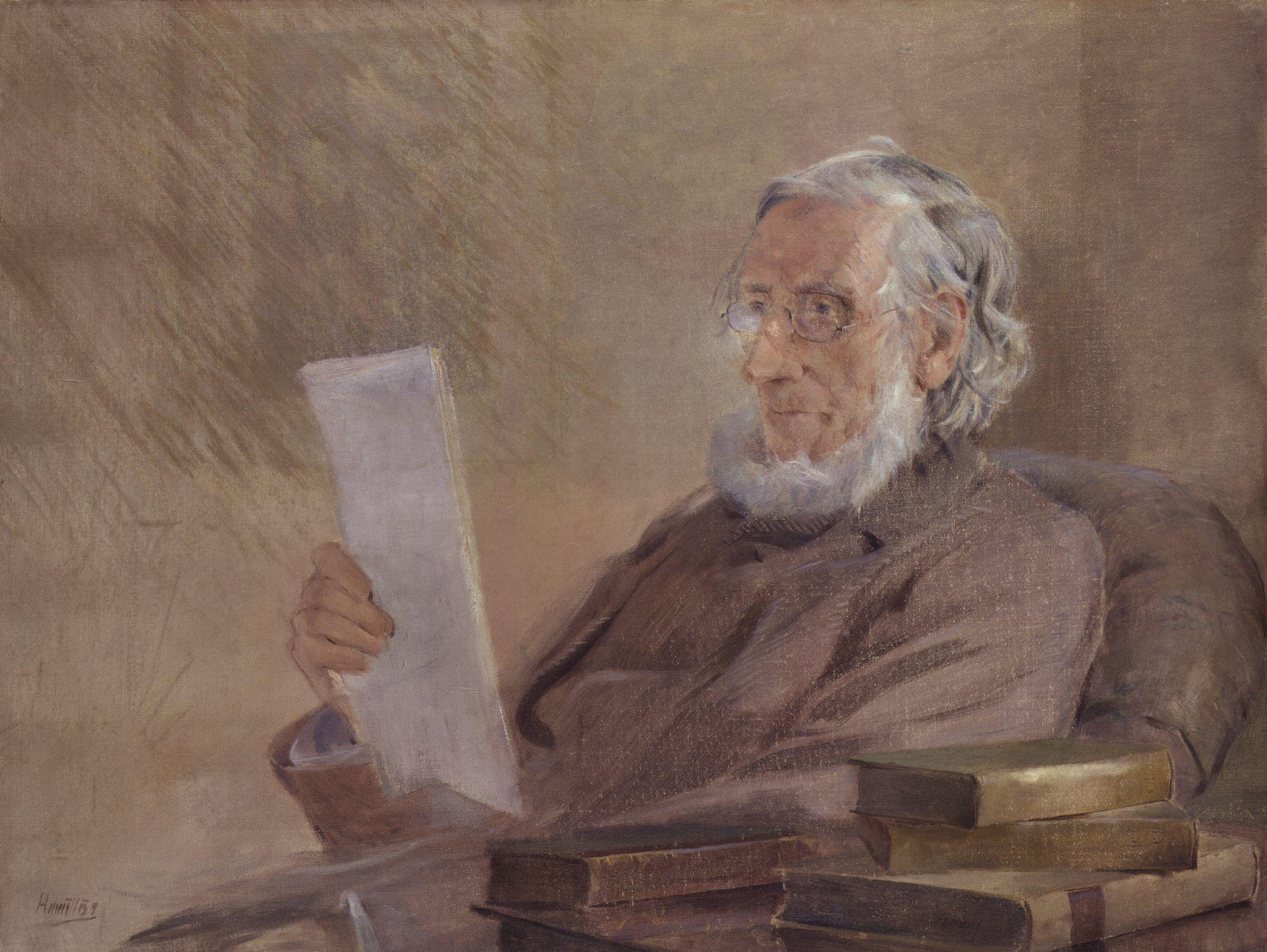
John Tyndall

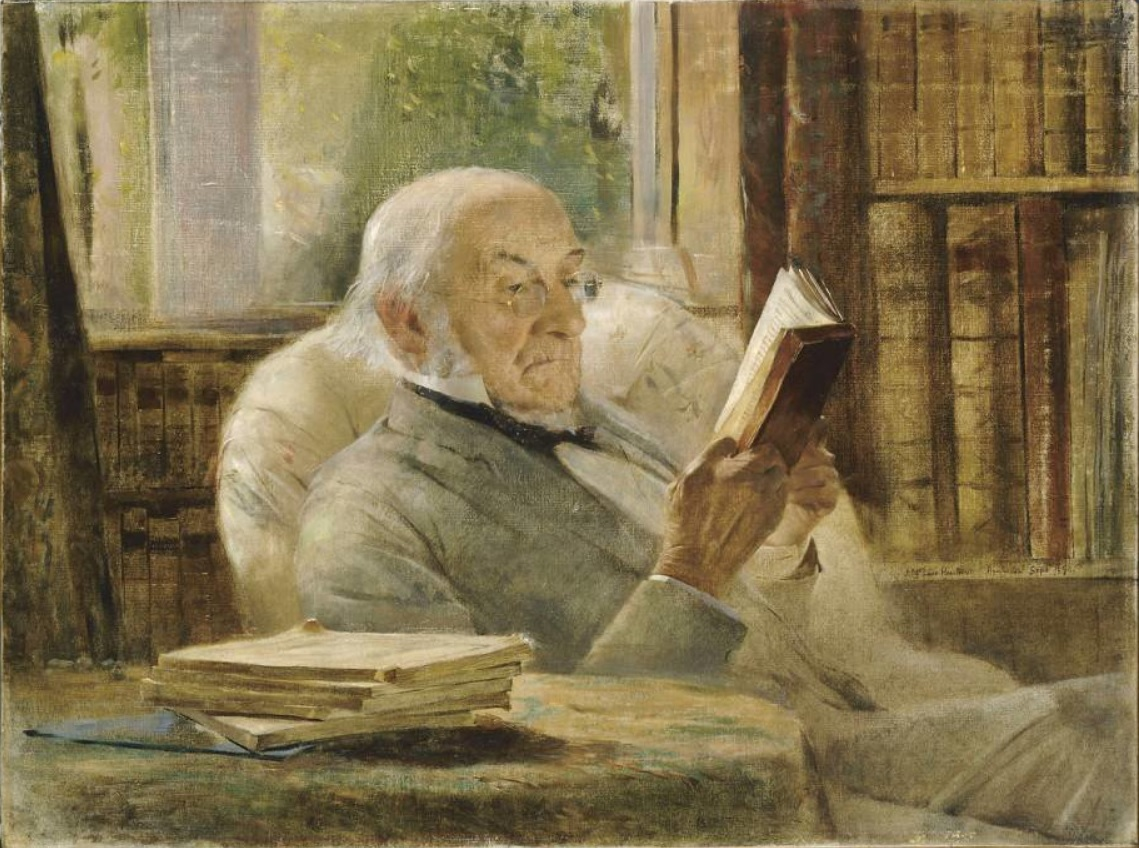
William Ewart Gladstone
