= Pennsylvania Academy of the Fine Arts =

Museum and art school in Philadelphia, Pennsylvania, U.S.

Coordinates: 39°57′18″N 75°9′50″W

- U.S. National Register of Historic Places
- U.S. National Historic Landmark
- Pennsylvania state historical marker
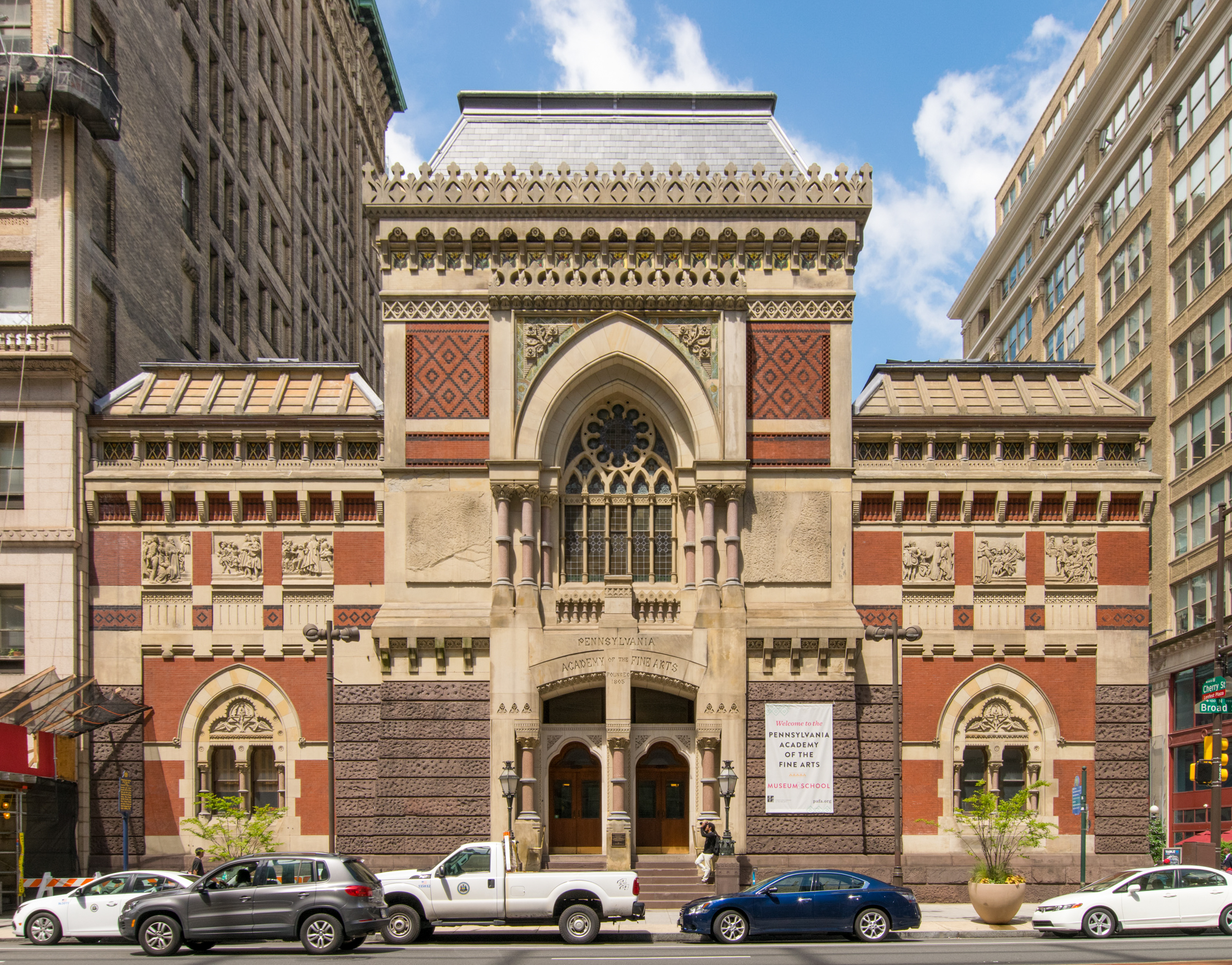
- The Pennsylvania Academy of Fine Arts in Center City Philadelphia

- Location within Philadelphia Location within Pennsylvania Location within the United States
- Location: 118-128 North Broad Street, Philadelphia, Pennsylvania, U.S.
- Built: 1871–1876
- Architects: Frank Furness; George Hewitt
- Architectural style: Second Empire, Renaissance, Gothic
- Website: www.pafa.org
- NRHP reference No.: 71000731

Significant dates
- Added to NRHP: May 27, 1971
- Designated NHL: May 15, 1975
- Designated PHMC: November 17, 2004
Pennsylvania Academy of the Fine Arts
- Type: Private art school
- Established: 1805
- Accreditation: MSCHE
- President: Eric G. Pryor
- Location: 118-128 Broad Street, Philadelphia, Pennsylvania, U.S.
- Website: www.pafa.org

The Pennsylvania Academy of the Fine Arts (PAFA) is a museum and private art school in Philadelphia, Pennsylvania, United States. Founded in 1805, it is the longest continuously operating art museum and art school in the United States.

The academy's museum is internationally known for its collections of 19th- and 20th-century American paintings, sculptures, and works on paper. Its archives house important materials for the study of American art history, museums, and art training. It offered a Bachelor of Fine Arts, Master of Fine Arts, certificate programs, and continuing education. Beginning in 2025, the academy will cease offering degrees except bachelor's degrees in conjunction with the University of Pennsylvania.

== History ==
=== 19th century ===
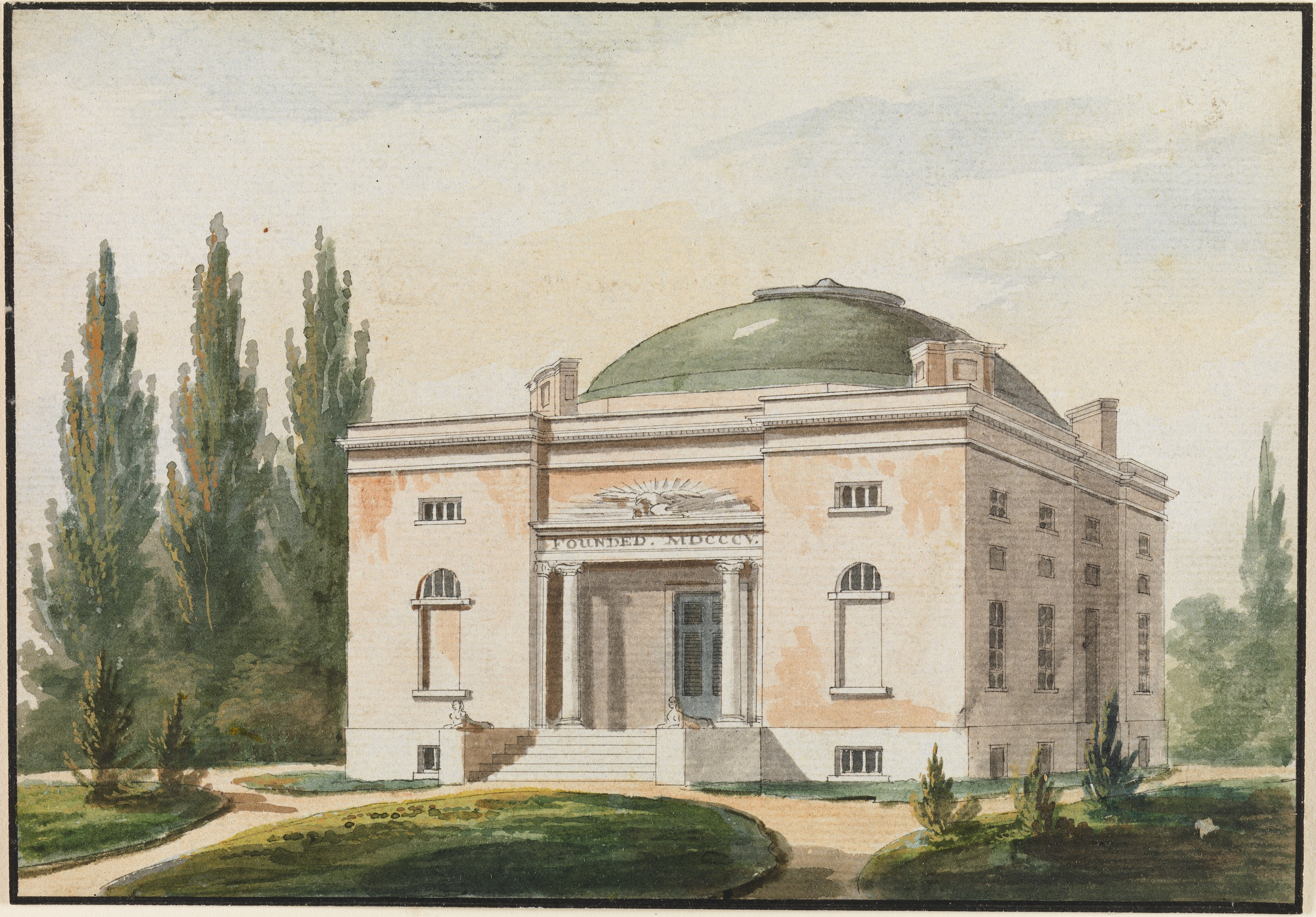
The Pennsylvania Academy of the Fine Arts' 1806 building featured in an 1809 engraving

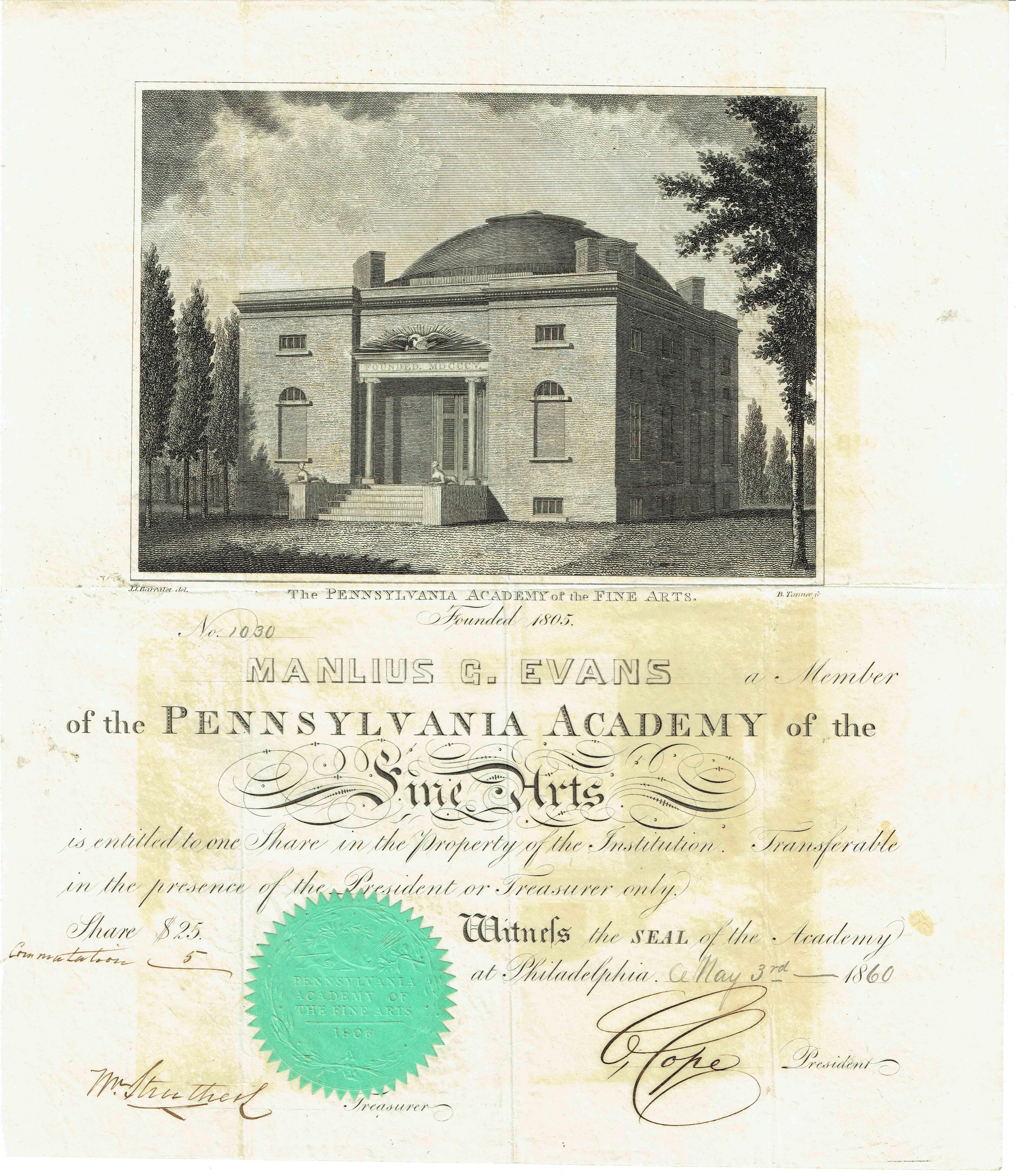
Share of the Pennsylvania Academy of the Fine Arts, issued in May 1860

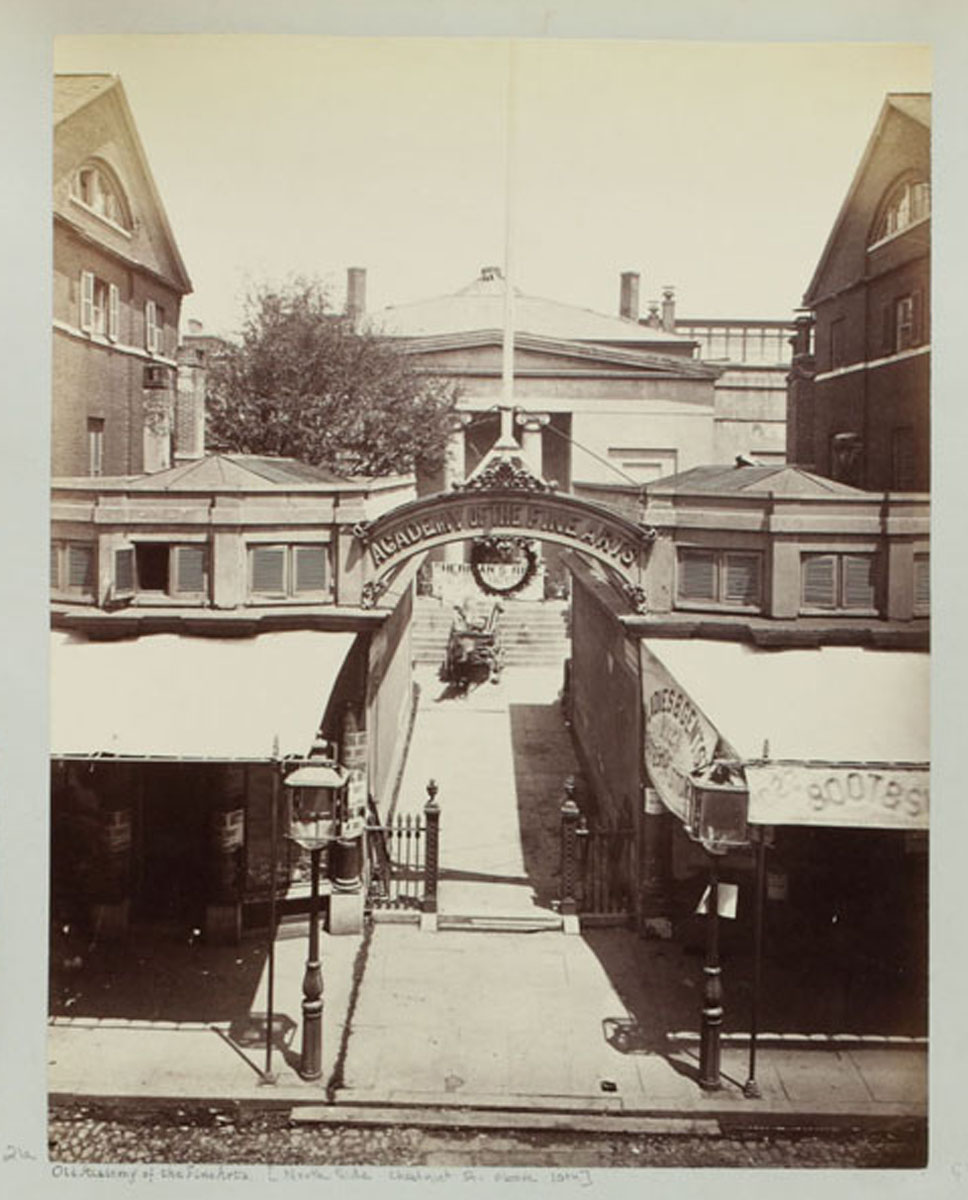
PAFA's 1845 building from a photograph, c. 1870

The Pennsylvania Academy of the Fine Arts was founded in 1805 by painter and scientist Charles Willson Peale, sculptor William Rush, and other artists and business leaders. Its first building on Chestnut and 10th Streets in Center City Philadelphia was designed by John Dorsey and opened in 1806. The academy opened as a museum in 1807 and held its first exhibition in 1811, where more than 500 paintings and statues were displayed. The first school classes held in the building were with the Society of Artists in 1810.

The academy had to be reconstructed after the fire of 1845. The new building by architect Richard Arthington Gilpin opened in 1847 and was demolished in 1870, following damage by a storm. The leaders of the academy then raised funds to construct a building more worthy of its treasures. They commissioned the current Furness-Hewitt building, which was constructed from 1871. It opened as part of the 1876 Philadelphia Exposition. The Chestnut Street site was leased to the vaudeville entrepreneur Robert Fox, who opened Fox's New American Theatre there in 1870.

In 1876, former academy student and artist Thomas Eakins returned to teach as a volunteer. Fairman Rogers, chairman of the Committee on Instruction from 1878 to 1883, appointed Eakins a faculty member in 1878, and promoted him to director in 1882. Eakins revamped the certificate curriculum to its current format. Students in the certificate program learned fundamentals of drawing, painting, sculpture, and printmaking, including relief, intaglio, and lithography, for two years. For the following two years, they conducted independent study, guided by critiques from faculty, students, and visiting artists. Notable alumni from this time include George Agnew Reid, a Canadian painter who was drawn to the program because of Thomas Eakins' radical approach to teaching. Reid studied at PAFA from 1882–1884.

The 1844 board of directors' declaration that women artists "would have exclusive use of the statue gallery for professional purposes" and study time in the museum on Monday, Wednesday, and Friday mornings began an incremental step of inclusion of women in the academy. In 1860, female students were allowed to take anatomy and antique courses, drawing from antique casts, and they were afforded access to the academy's library and gallery. Life classes, the study of the nude body, were available to women in the spring of 1868 with female models; male models were added for study six years later. This came after much debate on whether it was appropriate for women to view the nude male form.

In 1878, Catherine Drinker, at the age of 27, became the first woman to teach at the academy. In 1895, one of her pupils, her younger cousin Cecilia Beaux, became the first female faculty member at the academy to instruct painting and drawing.

=== 20th century ===
From 1890 to 1906, Edward Hornor Coates served as the tenth president of the academy. In 1915, he was awarded the academy's gold medal. In 1921, painter John McLure Hamilton, who began his art education at the academy under Thomas Eakins, described the contributions Coates made during his tenure:

The reign of Mr. Coates at the Academy marked the period of its greatest prosperity. Rich endowments were made to the schools, a gallery of national portraiture was formed, and some of the best examples of Gilbert Stuart's work acquired. The annual exhibitions attained a brilliancy and éclat hitherto unknown ... Mr. Coates wisely established the schools upon a conservative basis, building almost unconsciously the dykes high against the oncoming flow of insane novelties in art patterns ... In this last struggle against modernism the President was ably supported by Eakins, Anschutz, Grafly, [Henry Joseph] Thouron, Vonnoh, and Chase ... His unfailing courtesy, his disinterested thoughtfulness, his tactfulness, and his modesty endeared him to scholars and masters alike. No sacrifice of time or of means was too great, if he thought he could accomplish the end he always had in view—the honour and the glory of the Academy. It was under Mr. Coates' enlightened direction that was fulfilled the expressed wish of Benjamin West, the first honorary Academician, that "Philadelphia may be as much celebrated for her galleries of paintings by the native genius of the country, as she is distinguished by the virtues of her people; and that she may be looked up to as the Athens of the Western World in all that can give polish to the human mind."

Harrison S. Morris, managing director from 1892 to 1905, collected contemporary American art for the institution. Among the many masterpieces acquired during his tenure were works by Cecilia Beaux, William Merritt Chase, Frank Duveneck, Thomas Eakins, Winslow Homer, Childe Hassam, and Edmund Tarbell. Work by The Eight, which included former academy students Robert Henri and John Sloan, provides a transition between 19th- and 20th-century art movements.

=== 21st century ===
In 2010, the academy acquired the Linda Lee Alter Collection of Art by Women, including nearly 500 works by female artists, from collector Linda Lee Alter. Artists in the collection include Louise Bourgeois, Judy Chicago, Louise Nevelson, Kiki Smith, Kara Walker, and Philadelphia artists Barbara Bullock and Elizabeth Osborne. In 2012, the academy featured the collection in the exhibition The Female Gaze: Women Artists Making Their World.

== Operations ==
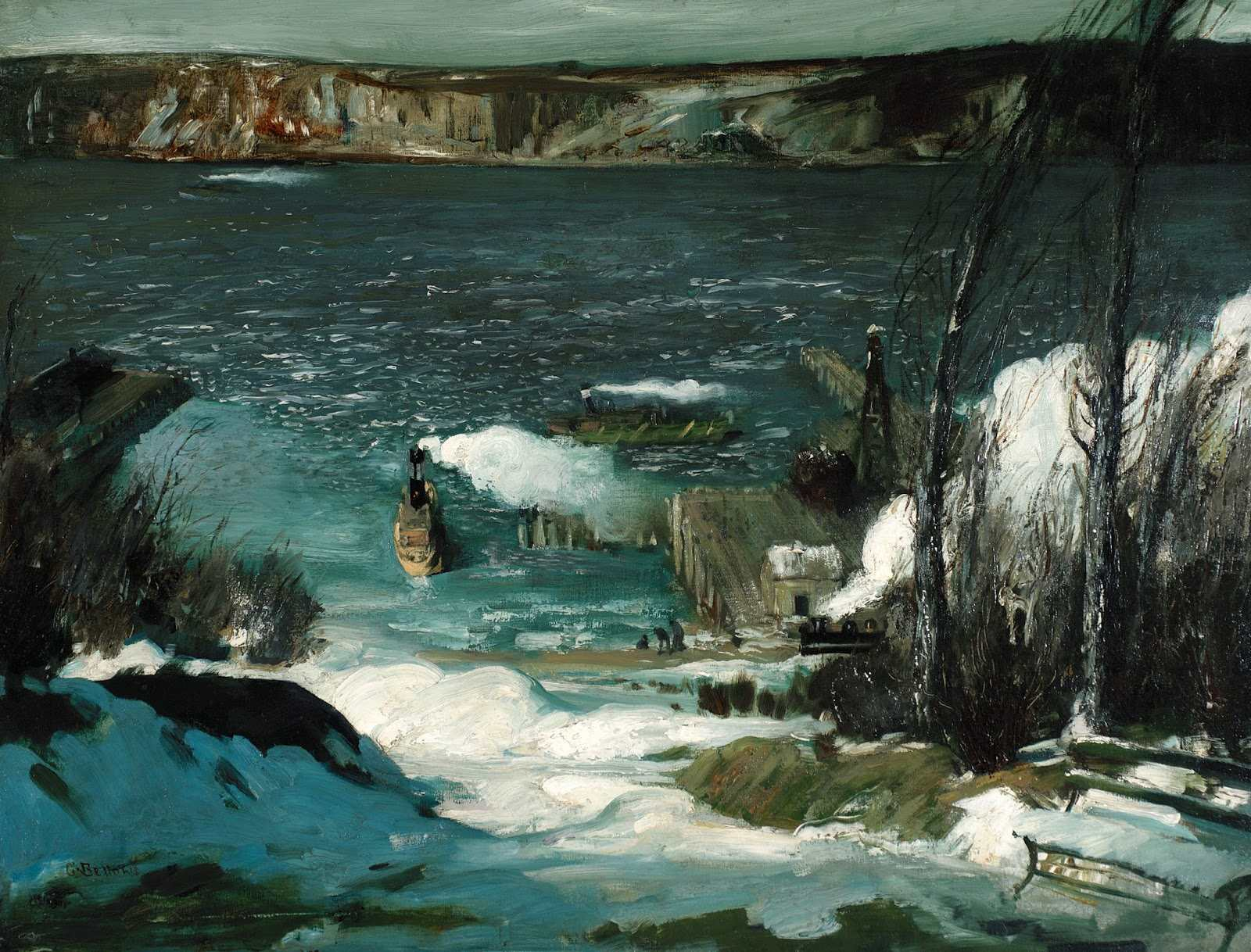
North River by George Bellows, 1908

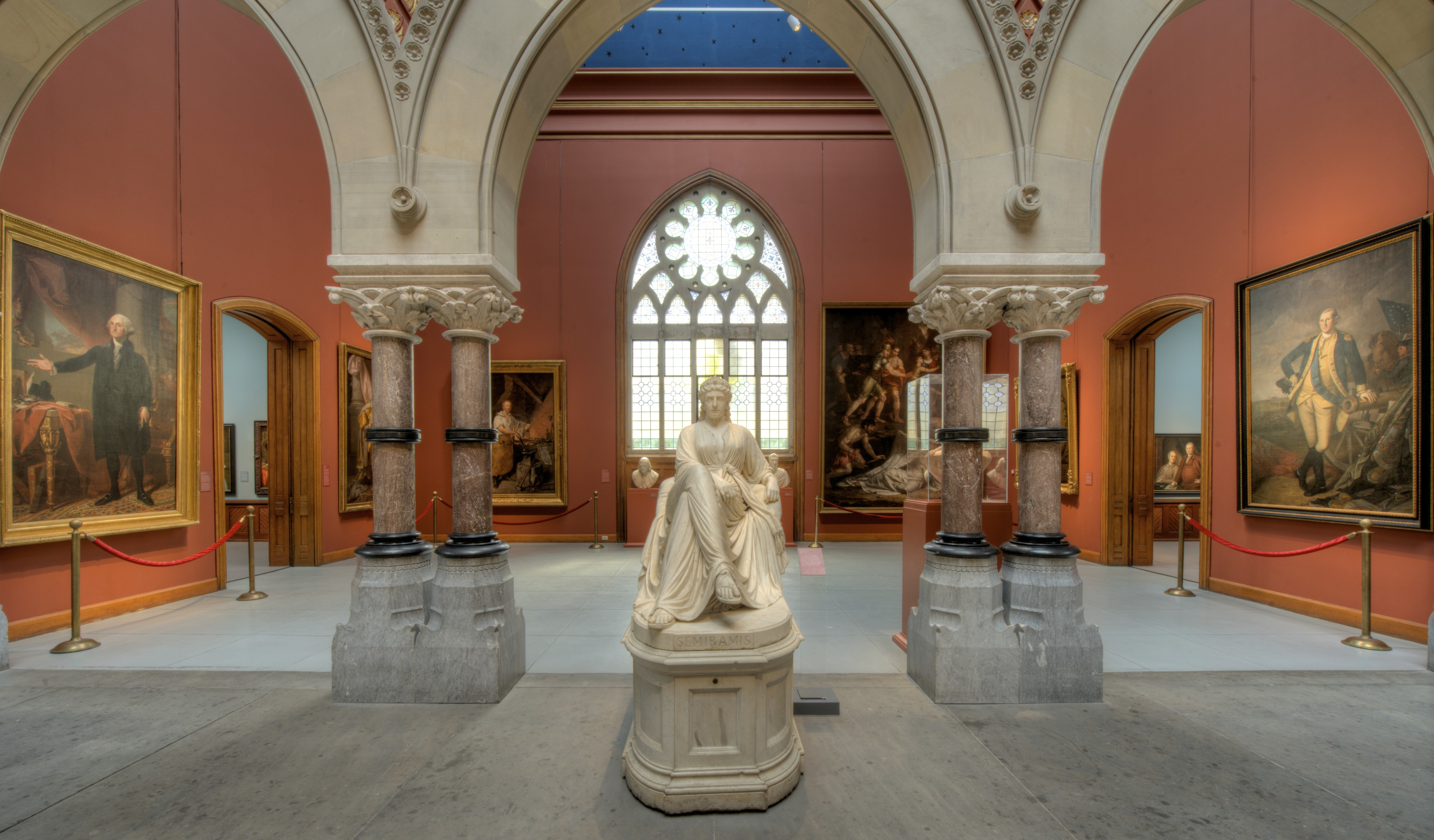
Washington Foyer

=== Museum ===
Since its founding, the academy has collected works by leading American artists, as well as works by distinguished alumni and faculty of its school. The academy maintains its collecting tradition with the inclusion of works by modern and contemporary American artists. Acquisitions and exhibition programs are balanced between historical and contemporary art, and the museum continues to show works by contemporary regional artists and features annual displays of work by academy students. The collection is installed in a chronological and thematic format, exploring the history of American art from the 1760s to the present.

=== School ===
The academy has a longstanding four-year certificate program. Beginning in 1929, qualified students have been able to apply for and receive a coordinated Bachelor of Fine Arts program from the University of Pennsylvania. The BFA degree program is also offered in-house, and a Master of Fine Arts program, post-baccalaureate certificate in graduate studies, and other education offerings are now offered.

In 2005, the academy received the National Medal of Arts in recognition of its role as a national leader in fine arts education.

In January 2007, in association with the Philadelphia Museum of Art, the academy purchased Thomas Eakins's work The Gross Clinic from the Jefferson Medical School. This work is displayed at both institutions on a rotating basis.

In January 2009, the academy signed a transfer agreement with Camden County College in Camden County, New Jersey, known as the Camden Connection, which allows for the transfer of liberal arts and studio classes and partial merit scholarships for qualified Camden County College students. Other transfer agreements are now in place with community college art departments at the Community College of Philadelphia, Montgomery County Community College, Atlantic Cape Community College, and Northampton Community College.

In 2013, the academy received Middle States Commission on Higher Education accreditation.

In 2024, the academy announced plans to terminate their degree granting programs. Starting from the 2024-2025 academic year, the institution stopped granting BFA or MFA degrees to students, due to an annual deficit of 3 million dollars, and a sharp decline in enrollment. Continuing education, certificate programs, and the bachelor's degree in conjunction with the University of Pennsylvania continue to be hosted by the institution.

== Buildings ==
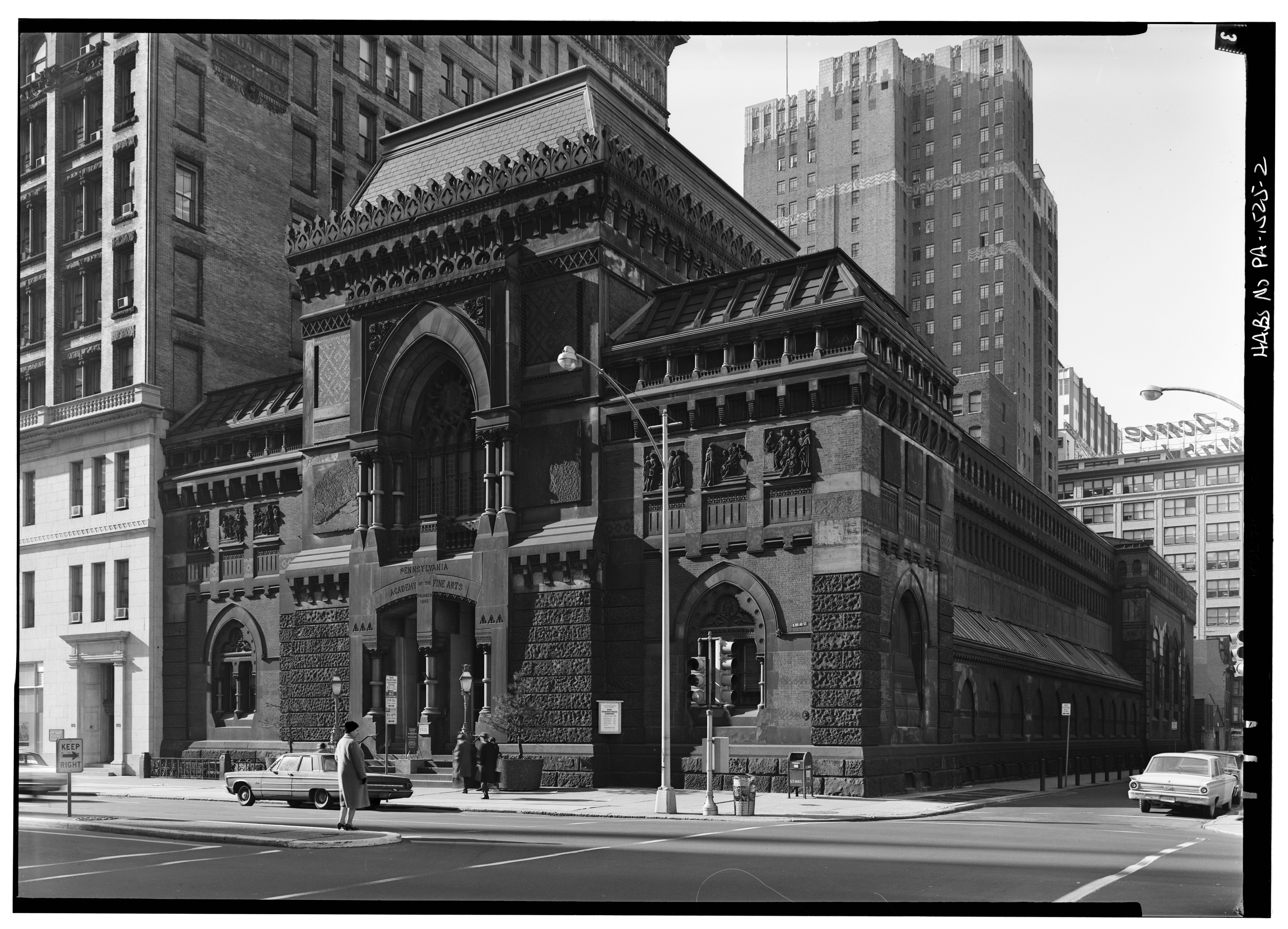
The Furness-Hewitt building in 1965

=== Furness-Hewitt building ===
The current museum building began construction in 1871 and opened in 1876 in connection with the Philadelphia Centennial. Designed by the American architects Frank Furness and George Hewitt, it has been called "One of the most magnificent Victorian buildings in the country." The building's façade draws from a number of different historical styles, including Second Empire, Renaissance Revival and Gothic Revival, amalgamated in an "aggressively personal manner". The building's exterior coloration combines "rusticated brownstone, dressed sandstone, polished pink granite, red pressed brick, and purplish terra-cotta." It was the first structure in the U.S. specifically designed for fine arts instruction and exhibition in a consolidated facility.

Interior of the Furness-Hewitt building

The inside of the building is equally varied, combining "gilt floral patterns incised on a field of Venetian red; ... [a] cerulean blue ceiling sprinkled with silver stars", and plum, ochre, sand and olive green gallery walls. The building's structure combines brick, stone and iron; because of fire-proofing concerns, some of the iron i-beams were left uncovered.

==== 1876 opening notes ====
The book A Century After, picturesque glimpses of Philadelphia and Pennsylvania includes the following on the 1876 opening:

The newly-built Academy of Fine Arts will bear comparison with any institution of its kind in America. It has a front of one hundred feet on Broad Street and a depth of two hundred and fifty-eight feet on Cherry Street. Its situation, with a street on each of its three sides, and an open space along a considerable portion of the fourth, is very advantageous as regards lighting, and freedom from risk by fire.

It is built of brick, the principal entrance, which is two stories high, being augmented with encaustic tiles, terra-cotta statuary, and light stone dressings. The walls are laid in patterns of red and white brick. Over the main entrance on Broad Street there is a large Gothic window with stone tracery. The Cherry Street front is relieved by a colonnade supporting arched windows, back of which is the transept and pointed gable.

Beyond the entrance vestibule is the main staircase, which starts from a wide hall and leads to the galleries on the second floor. Along the Cherry Street side of the Academy are five galleries arranged for casts from the antique; and, further on, are rooms for drapery painting, and the life class. These have a clear north light which can never be obstructed.

On the south side, there is a large lecture room, with retiring rooms, and back of these are the modeling rooms and rooms devoted to the use of students and professors.

On the second floor is the main hall, which extends across the building, and is intended for the exhibition of large works of art. This story is divided into galleries, which are lighted from the top. Through the center runs a hall which is set apart for the exhibition of statuary, busts, small statues, bas-reliefs, etc. On each side of this hall are picture galleries, which are so arranged in size and form as to admit of classification of pictures, and which can be divided into suits where separate exhibitions may be held at the same time.

The art collections of the gallery are considered the most valuable in America. They comprise the masterpieces of Stuart, Sully, Allston, West, and others of our early artists, the Gilpin gallery, fine marbles, and facsimiles of famous statues, as well as a magnificent gallery from the antique.

The building is now considered one of the most notable buildings in Philadelphia and one of Furness' greatest works. In 1971, the building was named to the National Register of Historic Places. Four years later, in 1975, it was designated a National Historic Landmark.

In 1976, the building's exterior and interior was refurbished to coincide with its centennial and with the United States bicentennial. The restoration work was conducted through Day and Zimmerman Associates, and headed by Human Myers.

In 2019, architectural firm DLR Group completed another renovation on both the Furness-Hewitt and Hamilton buildings to accommodate growth within the institution's fixed site while maintaining the buildings' historic details.

=== Samuel M.V. Hamilton building ===
In 2002, Dorrance H. Hamilton made a large donation to the academy for its expansion, and the academy purchased the former automobile factory at 128 N. Broad Street, next to the original building. Designed by Charles Oelschlager, the building was formerly a federal government building. The structure was renamed in memory of her husband, Samuel M.V. Hamilton. The academy completed its move there in September 2006.

The new building includes an exhibition space, the Fisher Brooks Gallery, named after James R. Fisher, an artist who attended the academy in the late 1880s, and Leonie Brooks. They are the grandfather and mother, respectively, of Marguerite Lenfest, a philanthropist and academy board member. The Hamilton building also houses Portfolio, the museum's gift shop.

=== Awards presented to individuals by the academy ===
- Widener Gold Medal: The academy established the George D. Widener Gold Medal for sculpture in 1912. Widener was a businessman and director of the academy who died on the RMS Titanic. The award recognizes the "most meritorious work of Sculpture modeled by an American citizen and shown in the Annual Exhibition".

==== Defunct awards ====
- Beck Gold Medal: The Carol H. Beck Gold Medal was awarded to the best portrait by an American artist exhibited at PAFA's annual exhibition. It was awarded from 1909 to 1968.
- Mary Smith Prize: The Mary Smith Prize was awarded to "the Painter of the best painting (not excluding portraits) exhibiting at the Academy, painted by a resident woman Artist." It was awarded from 1879 to 1968.
- Temple Gold Medal: The Joseph Temple Fund Gold Medal was awarded to the best oil painting by an American artist exhibited at PAFA's annual exhibition. It was awarded from 1883 to 1968.

== Deaccessioning ==
In 2013, the academy sold East Wind Over Weehawken, a 1934 painting that is among two Edward Hopper works in the academy's collection, to start an endowment fund. About 25 percent of the fund will be used to fill gaps in the collection of historic art, with most of the rest to buy contemporary art of undetermined value with hopes for dramatic increases in the future. The painting was sold at auction for $40,485,000, resulting in a boost to the museum's endowment by approximately $23.5 million.

== See also ==
- List of National Historic Landmarks in Philadelphia
- National Register of Historic Places listings in Center City, Philadelphia
