= Prints in Progress =

Printing program

Prints in Progress, a program run through The Print Center of Philadelphia, was founded by Walter Wolf in 1960 and ran through at least 1990.

This program was developed to fill a need in the Philadelphia educational system to appreciate and practice printing, such as etching, lithography, and block printing. Prints in Progress introduced printing to children in local schools through demonstrations by professional artists. The program was enabled in large part through the development of the portable press, which allowed artists and printmakers to bring this program to schools throughout Philadelphia. Previously, the sheer weight of engraving or lithographic presses prevented such an endeavor, limiting this process to the artist’s studio. Each artist would lecture and simultaneously give illustrative demonstrations of the three printing processes named above.

Wolf raised funds for the project from individual Philadelphian donors, the Loeb Foundation, and the Philadelphia Foundation, requiring only small fees for demonstrations from participating schools. Artists Benton Spruance, Jerome Kaplan, and Samuel Maitin formed the original Artists’ Committee. Maitin led the first demonstration of intaglio printing for a group of students at Philadelphia’s Masterman School on December 2, 1960.

Allan L. Edmunds and Marion Boulton “Kippy” Stroud both began their careers at Prints in Progress, with Edmunds going on to found the Brandywine Workshop in 1972 and Stroud founding the Fabric Workshop and Museum in 1977.
