= The Print Center =

Coordinates: 39°56′53.2″N 75°10′6.8″W

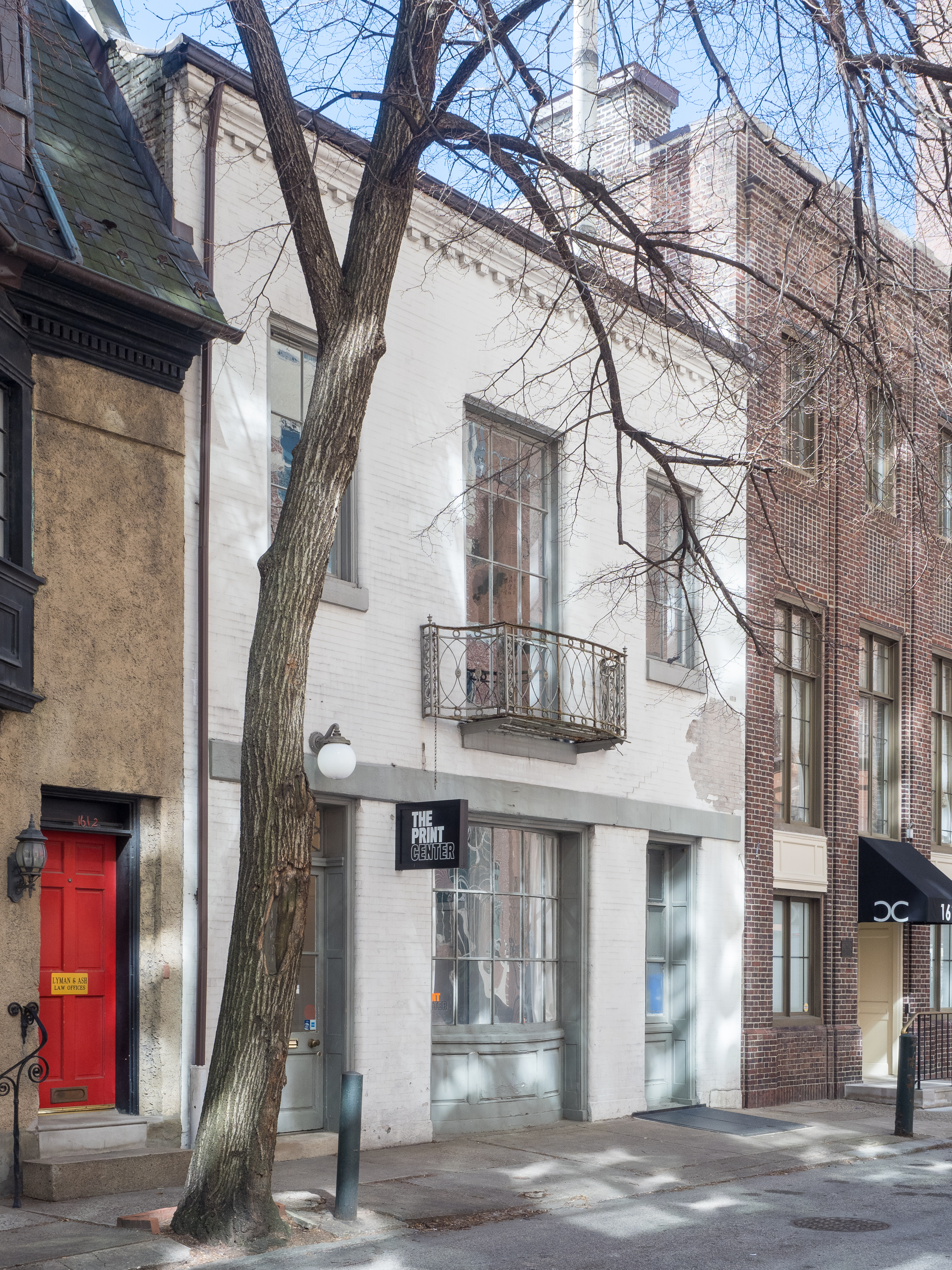
- Former name: The Print Club
- Established: 1915
- Location: 1614 Latimer Street, Philadelphia, PA, 19103
- Executive director: Elizabeth F. Spungen
- President: Hester Stinnett
- Website: http://printcenter.org

The Print Center is a nonprofit gallery located in Rittenhouse Square in Philadelphia. Originally known as The Print Club, the gallery's mission is to "encourage the growth and understanding of photography and printmaking as vital contemporary arts through exhibitions, publications and educational programs".

== History ==
The Print Center was founded in 1915 as The Print Club of Philadelphia by a group of art collectors and artists who wished to promote the art of printmaking. Its first location was 219 South 17th Street in Philadelphia; but it moved to its current home in a late 19th Century carriage house at 1614 Latimer Street in 1918. In 1924 The Print Center's ANNUAL International Competition was established, now one of the oldest competitions of its kind in the United States. Although photographs were first exhibited at The Print Center in the 1930s, they were formally included into its mission in the 1960s. The Print Center also focused on bringing art into schools around Philadelphia. In the 1960s, they started Prints in Progress, which brought a portable printing press and printmakers to inner-city schools and communities for workshops. Allan L. Edmunds and Marion B. "Kippy" Stroud got their start in this program and would go on to found the Brandywine Workshop and the Fabric Workshop & Museum, respectively. In continuing its mission to promote printed work, The Print Center opened the Gallery Store in 1991, which currently represents about 75 local, national and international artists. The Print Center established a Curator position to provide a higher level of content for the wider Philadelphia community. In 2002, The Print Center's award-winning Artists-in-Schools Program (AISP) was started and which continues to provide complete and self-contained, year-long artist residencies and classroom instruction to Philadelphia public high schools and afterschool programs free of charge. The program has served thousands of students Philadelphia's neighborhoods. Each year a portfolio of student projects is mounted online and exhibitions have AISP projects have been mounted throughout the city, including a 2014 exhibition at Philadelphia International Airport.

=== The Print Center Galleries ===
The Print Center has three gallery spaces, two upstairs and one downstairs, which can hold three separate shows or one large show at once. On average The Print Center holds around 7 solo and group exhibitions a year of both photographic and printed work.

=== ANNUAL International Competition ===
The Print Center's ANNUAL International Competition is one of the oldest competitions of its kind in the United States. Started in 1924, artists who use printmaking and/or photography as critical components of their work, or whose work pushes the boundaries of traditional photographic and printmaking practices, are encouraged to enter.

=== The Print Club of Philadelphia Permanent Collection at the Philadelphia Museum of Art ===
Begun under Former Executive Director Berthe von Moschzisker in 1942, The Permanent Collection of the Print Center resides at the Philadelphia Museum of Art and contains over 1,600 works. Every year since 1929, prizewinning prints (and since the late 1970s) photographs from The Print Center's Annual International Competition have been placed in the Permanent Collection at the Museum.

=== The Gallery Store ===
Formally a printing studio on the first floor, The Gallery Store, was opened in 1991 as a sales venue for prints, photographs and artists’ books.
