= Susan Kaprov =

American artist

Susan Kaprov (born 1946, New York City) is an American multi-disciplinary artist whose work spans the fields of photography, painting, graphic design, and installation art.

Kaprov became widely recognized in 1975 for photomontages that combined the use of scanners, Haloid Xerox machines, and office copiers. In 2019 sixteen of these experimental works were acquired by the Whitney Museum of American Art.

== Education ==
Susan Kaprov studied biology and art history at the City College of New York (CCNY) and received a Bachelor of Science degree in 1970. From 1971 to 1973, she studied architecture, graphic design, and fine arts at Dartmouth College and New York City Technical College in 1979.

== Career ==
In 1975 Kaprov's self-portraits and photomontages were seen at the Rosa Esman Gallery and then in a group exhibition later that year. When these self-portraits debuted to the public at The Vassar College Art Gallery in September 1976, art critic Peter Frank identified Kaprov as one of the most successful artists in the medium at that time.

The exhibition at Vassar College was followed a group exhibition at the Museum of Modern Art titled, "Prints: Acquisitions 1973–1976" In 1978 Kaprov's first solo show at the Terry Dintenfass Gallery titled "Parts of a World" presented a new print portfolio titled "Remembrance of Things Present" (1977–78) in addition to a selection of paintings. Her next series, titled "White Light Drawings", was exhibited at the Hayden Planetarium in New York City.

In 1981 the Brooklyn Museum acquired "20th Century Dilemma I" This installation reflected a collaged, grid structure on a monumental scale. By 1989 Kaprov had produced public art installations for a number of several organizations.

In 2004 Kaprov produced "Time Travelers" for the Wilcox Technical High School in Meriden, Connecticut. "Urban Helix" (2006) a fired, enamel-on-glass installation was commissioned as a permanent installation at New York University's Polytechnic Institute.

In 2011, Kaprov was selected from a national competition to create a ten-minute, single-channel animated sports video for the University of Iowa’s Carver–Hawkeye Arena, merging live-action sports team footage with original hand-drawn animation.

In 2013, Kaprov conducted a participatory puzzle-making project, entitled Piecing it Together at the Museum of Modern Art. Two more commissions were completed between 2012 and 2014 respectively.

Examples of Kaprov's work are represented in the collections of the Metropolitan Museum of Art, the Museum of Modern Art, the Smithsonian, the Brooklyn Museum the Rose Art Museum, the art gallery at Rowan University, and the Visual Studies Workshop.

== Fellowships and grants ==
- 1971, 1973, 1990 MacDowell Fellowship for Painting
- 1989 Brandywine Printmaking Workshop Fellowship, Philadelphia PA

== Select solo exhibitions ==
- 1978 Terry Dintenfass Gallery, New York
- 1976 Vassar College Art Gallery, Poughkeepsie, New York
- 1978 Hayden Planetarium, New York
- 1981 The Brooklyn Museum, Grand Lobby Installation: ‘20th Century Dilemma’
- 1987 Dance Theater Workshop Gallery, New York
- 1988 Stamford Art Museum, Stamford, Connecticut

== Select public art commissions ==
- Carver–Hawkeye Sports Arena, University of Iowa
- The Federal Courthouse, Jacksonville, Florida
- National Aeronautics and Space Administration (NASA), Washington DC
- Polytechnic University Institute of New York University at the MetroTech Center in Brooklyn, New York

== Personal life ==
Kaprov was married to the physicist David Stoler until his death in 2018.
