= Richard Hunt (sculptor) =

American artist and sculptor (1935–2023)

- Born: Richard Howard Hunt; September 12, 1935; Chicago, Illinois, U.S.
- Died: December 16, 2023 (aged 88); Chicago, Illinois, U.S.
- Education: Englewood High School
- Alma mater: School of the Art Institute of Chicago
- Occupation: Sculptor
- Years active: 1953–2023
- Known for: Sculpture, drawing, printmaking
- Notable work: Hero's Head (1956); Arachne (1956); Steel Bloom, Number 10 (1956); Hero Construction (1958); The Chase (1965); Harlem Hybrid (1976); I Have Been to the Mountain (1977); Jacob's Ladder (1978); From the Sea (1983); Slowly toward the North (1984); From the ground Up (1989); Freeform (1993); Flintlock Fantasy or the Promise of Force (1991–1996); Flight Forms (2001); We Will (2005); Swing Low (2016); Scholar's Rock or Stone of Hope or Love of Bronze (2014–2020)
- Spouses: Bettye Scott (m. 1957; div. 1966); Lenora Cartright (m. 1983; died 1989); Anuschka Menist (m. 1992, divorced)
- Website: richardhuntsculptor.org

Richard Howard Hunt (September 12, 1935 – December 16, 2023) was an American artist and sculptor. In the second half of the 20th century, he became "the foremost African-American abstract sculptor and artist of public sculpture." A Chicago native, Hunt studied at the School of the Art Institute of Chicago in the 1950s. While there he received multiple prizes for his work. In 1971, he was the first African-American sculptor to have a retrospective at Museum of Modern Art. Hunt has created over 160 public sculpture commissions, more than any other sculptor in prominent locations in 24 states across the United States.

With a career spanning seven decades, Hunt held over 250 solo exhibitions, been included in over 500 group exhibitions, and is represented in more than 130 public museums across the world. His notable abstract, modern and contemporary sculpture and works on paper have appeared in museum and gallery exhibitions since the 1950s. Richard Hunt used “industrial materials and modern methods to sculpt organic forms and historical archetypes, such as freedom, flight, and progress” throughout his career.

He was one of the first artists to serve on the governing body for National Endowment for the Arts and later served on the board of the Smithsonian American Art Museum. In 2022, Barack Obama stated that "Richard Hunt is one of the greatest artists Chicago has ever produced."

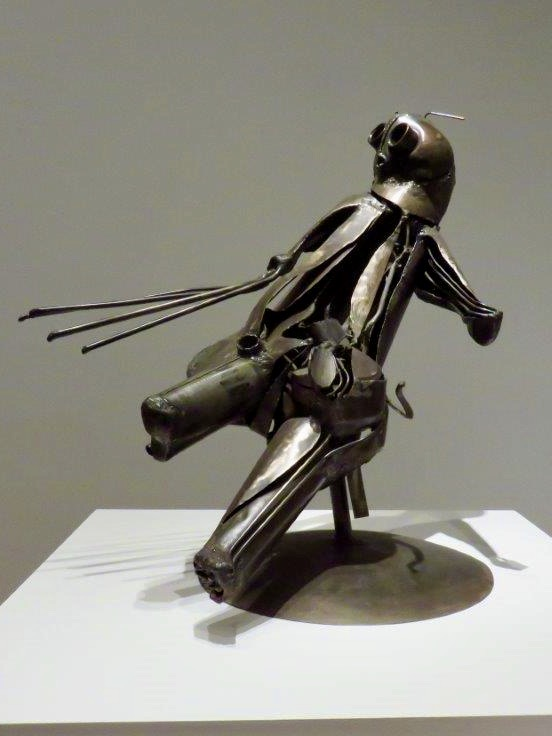
Arachne, 1956, Museum of Modern Art

== Early life ==
Richard Hunt was born in 1935 on Chicago's South Side and raised in the Woodlawn and Englewood neighborhoods. Hunt and his younger sister, Marian, grew up with their parents, Cleophus Howard Hunt, a barber, and Etoria Inez Henderson Hunt, a librarian and beautician. The Hunts were descendants of enslaved people brought from West Africa through the Port of Savannah, and often visited extended family in Georgia. Although he moved to Galesburg, Illinois at eleven years old, he spent the majority of his time in the city of Chicago. From an early age he was interested in the arts. Accompanying his mother, a beautician and librarian, he attended performances by local opera companies that sang classical repertoires of Mozart, Rossini, Verdi, and Handel.

As a young boy, Hunt began to show enthusiasm and talent for drawing, painting, and sculpting, interests that he increasingly developed. Inspired to pursue his career in the arts, he stated "My mom was supportive and dad was tolerant." Hunt also acquired business sense and awareness of social issues from working in his father's barbershop.

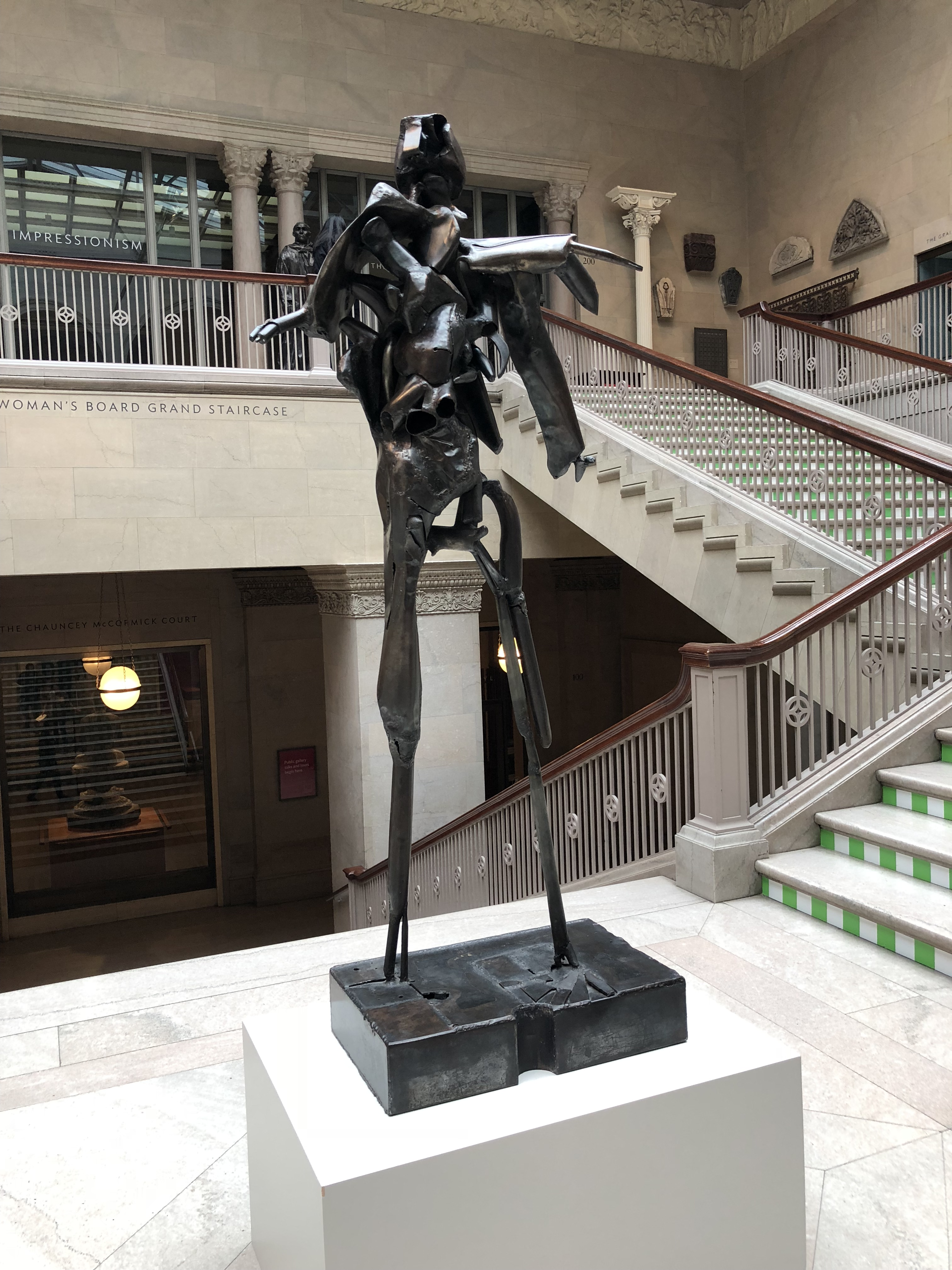
Hero Construction, 1958, Art Institute of Chicago, IL

As a teenager, Hunt began his work in sculpture, working with clay, carving wood, and modeling Sculpt-Metal. While his work started in a makeshift studio in his 1940s bedroom, he eventually built a basement studio in his father's barbershop and later a basement studio in the family's Englewood home.

=== Education ===
Beginning in the eighth grade at age 13, Hunt took classes at the Art Institute of Chicago's Junior School of the Arts. He graduated early from Englewood High School in January 1953 and entered the School of the Art Institute of Chicago later that year, and graduated in 1957. He also took classes at the University of Illinois and the University of Chicago.

While studying at the School of the Art Institute of Chicago, Hunt focused his sculptural work on creating soldered wire figures, then on welding sculptures, as well as producing drawings, paintings, and lithographs. The School of the Art Institute of Chicago did not have classes or materials suitable for learning welding, so he purchased his own welding equipment in 1955, and with little instruction, taught himself to weld in the basement studio of his father's barbershop. Interested in Modernism, Abstract Expressionism, and Surrealism, he experimented with the assemblage of broken machine parts, car bumpers, and metals from the junkyard reshaping them into organic forms. Hunt went on to work with iron, steel, copper, and aluminum producing a series of "hybrid figures", references to human, animal, and plant forms. Hunt explored the interplay of organic and industrial subject matter in his artwork. His earliest works, which often represented classical themes, are more figurative than his later works.

Hunt began exhibiting his sculptures nationwide while still a student at the School of the Art Institute of Chicago. In 1957 as a senior, his piece Arachne (1956) was purchased by the Museum of Modern Art in New York. He received a bachelor's of arts in education (BAE) from the School of the Art Institute of Chicago that same year.

=== Notable degrees ===
In addition to his studies, Hunt received eighteen honorary degrees from universities all over the country. Some of which include the School of the Art Institute of Chicago (Chicago, IL), Northwestern University (Evanston, IL), Tufts University (Medford, MA), and the University of Notre Dame (Notre Dame, IN).

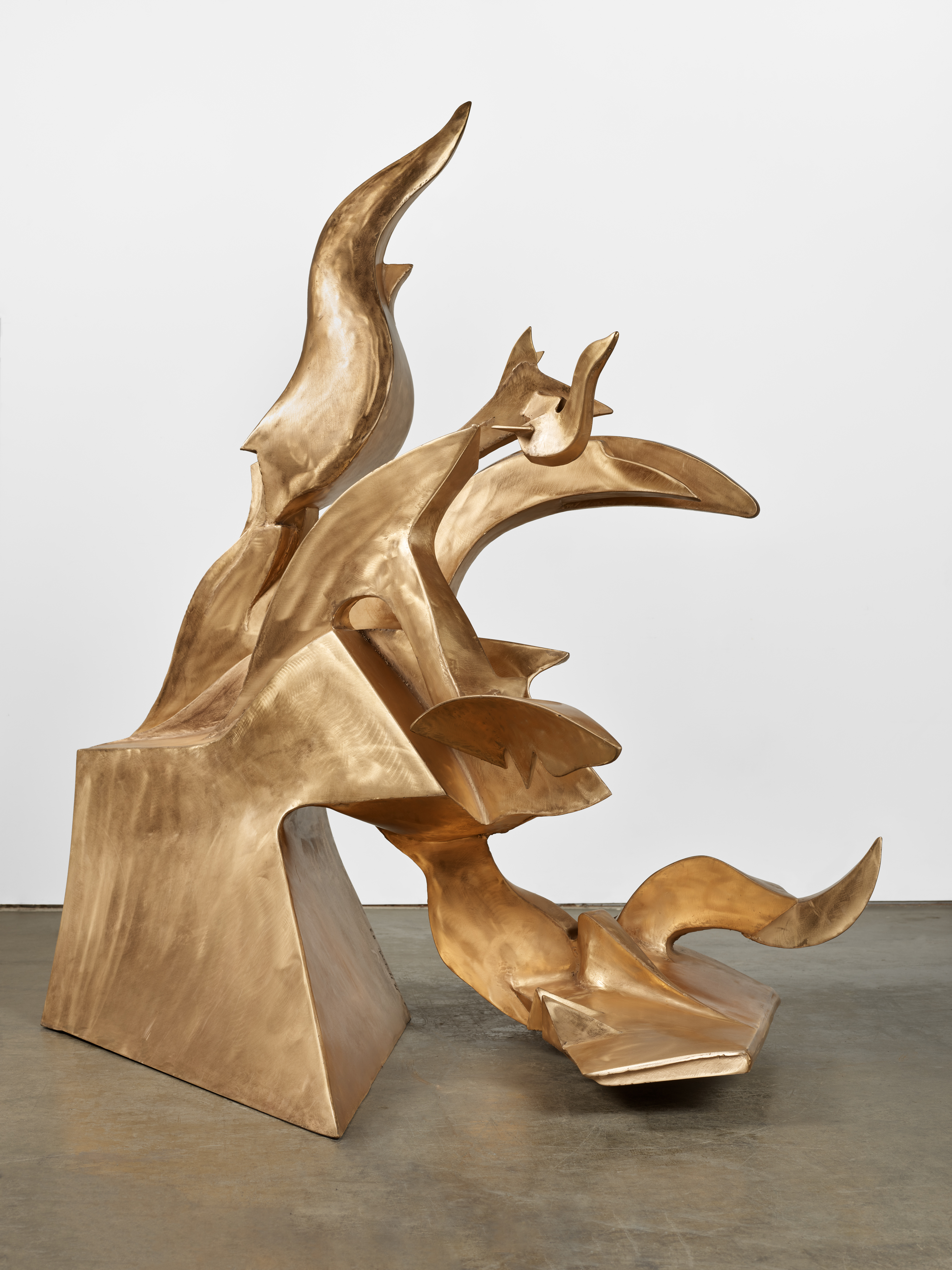
From the Sea, 1983, welded bronze, 71 × 45 × 64 in. (180 × 114 × 163 cm)

=== European travel ===
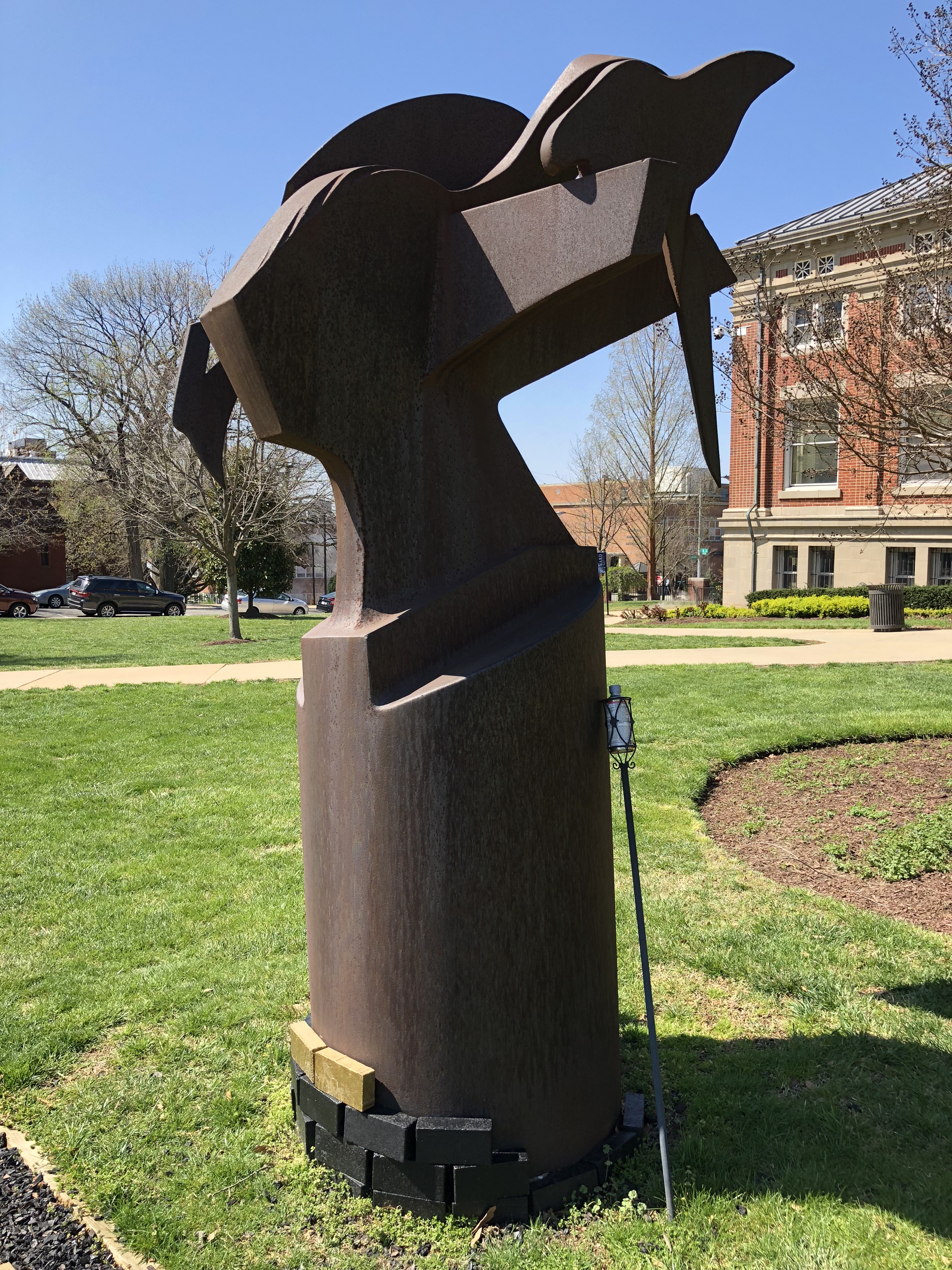
Richard Hunt's Symbiosis was given to Howard University as a gift by former school trustee Hobart Taylor.

Upon graduating, Hunt was awarded the James Nelson Raymond Foreign Travel Fellowship. He sailed to England on the SS United States and then to Paris, where he leased a car, a Citroën 2CV, to travel to Spain, Italy, and eventually back to Paris. He spent most of his time in Florence, where he learned to cast his first sculptures in bronze, at the renowned Marinelli foundry. His time abroad solidified his belief that metal was the definitive medium of the twentieth century.

=== Military service ===
Hunt served in the United States Army from 1958 to 1960. He took basic training at Fort Leonard Wood. Hunt served as an illustrator for Brooke Army Medical Center.

=== Desegregation activism ===
On March 7, 1960, Mary Andrews, president of the local youth council of the NAACP, wrote letters to store managers in downtown San Antonio, Texas, who operated white-only lunch counters. Encouraged by the growing sit-in movement, she requested equal services be provided to all, regardless of race. Hunt in U.S. Army uniform went to lunch at Woolworth's on March 16, 1960. Seated at the counter, his order was taken, and he was served without incident. Hunt, the only known African American to eat at San Antonio's Woolworth's lunch counter that day, fulfilled Mary Andrews's vision of integration. This action, along with a handful of other African Americans at other lunch counters across the city, made San Antonio the first peaceful and voluntary lunch counter integration in the south.

=== Teaching ===
After completing his military service, Hunt was invited to teach a class in metal design by the School of the Art Institute of Chicago during the 1960–1961 academic year. He also taught sculpture, drawing, and metalworking at the University of Illinois branch at Navy pier for two years. In 1962, Hunt was awarded the John Simon Guggenheim Memorial Fellowship for Creative Sculpture, which enabled him to stop teaching and become a full-time sculptor.

=== Influences ===
Hunt began to experiment with materials and sculpting techniques, influenced heavily by progressive twentieth-century artists. At the age of 17, Hunt was inspired to focus on sculpture after visiting the exhibition, Sculpture of the Twentieth Century, which was held at the Art Institute of Chicago in 1953. The Sculpture of the Twentieth Century included works of Pablo Picasso, Julio González, David Smith, Constantin Brancusi, Reg Butler, Lynn Chadwick, Alberto Giacometti, Umberto Boccioni, and Jean Arp. At the exhibition, Hunt for the first time saw various artworks of welded metal. Hunt was also inspired and paid respect to French sculptor Raymond Duchamp-Villon whose 1914 bronze "Horse" was instructional. Seeing these artists' works led Hunt to teach himself how to solder wire to create small figures. He would later go on to create both figurative and abstract shapes by learning to weld metal in 1955. Hunt also focused on linear-spatial arrangement of his materials where he followed Julio González's footsteps into three-dimensional structures.

== Career ==
From 1955 through the 1970s, Hunt used scrap yards as his quarries and transformed salvaged metal into abstract, welded sculptures. Early works such as Hero’s Head (1956), Arachne (1956), Steel Bloom, Number 10 (1956), and Hero Construction (1958) set the foundation for Hunt's exploration of various sculptural forms; and his merging of anthropomorphic, biomorphic, and metamorphic elements into single works of art. These early sculptures were followed by a series of welded metal compositions with a calligraphic style that experimented with linear space. Following the influence of Julio González, Hunt's “drawing in space” sculptures pushed the limits of metals’ tensile strength to create delicate and expansive linear forms. In the early 1960s, Hunt began to explore enclosed forms with a focus on incorporating rounded, organic shapes and axial geometry.

Hunt's frequent experimentation garnered critically positive response from the art community, such that Hunt was exhibited at several of the Artists of Chicago and Vicinity Shows and the American Show, where the Museum of Modern Art purchased Arachne (1956) for its collection. He was the youngest artist to exhibit at the 1962 Seattle World's Fair, a major international survey exhibition of modern art.

Hunt received his first sculpture commission from the State of Illinois Public Art Program in 1967. In 1969, he finished the commission, resulting in a public artwork named Play. This was the start of Hunt's use of Cor-Ten steel as a material, which was inspired by Picasso's use of the same material in his large work (The Picasso) in Daley Plaza, Chicago. Hunt's Play stands in the John J. Madden Health Center in Maywood, Illinois.

In 1971, Hunt acquired a deactivated electrical substation near northern Chicago and repurposed it into a metal welding sculpture studio. The station came equipped with a bridge crane, which was convenient for moving large sculpture pieces, and a spacious 40-foot (12 m) ceiling. While handling the metal, Hunt worked with two assistants. Hunt described metalworks as "free play of forms evolving, developing and contrasting with one another."

Seeking a more direct connection with nature, Hunt bought a farmhouse on 26 acres in McHenry County, Illinois, in 1974, while continuing to maintain his Lill Avenue studio in Chicago. He also purchased a satellite studio in Benton Harbor, Michigan in 1995 as part of an initiative to revitalize the community. This Richard Hunt Studio Center was gifted to the Krasl Art Center in August 2023.

In 1981, Hunt was chosen to serve as one of eight jurors—both the youngest and the sole African American—for the Vietnam Veterans Memorial design competition. On March 30, 1,421 designs were submitted and displayed for the jury in an airport hangar at Andrews Air Force Base. Ultimately, the jury, including Hunt, selected a design by Maya Lin.

Hunt was the first African American visual artist to serve on the National Council on the Arts, the governing body of the National Endowment for the Arts. He was appointed by President Lyndon Johnson in 1968. He also served on boards of the Smithsonian Institution. From 1980 to 1988, Hunt served as Commissioner of the Smithsonian Institution's National Museum of American Art. From 1994 to 1997, Hunt served on the Smithsonian Institution's National Board of Directors.

In 2023, Hunt established the Richard Hunt Legacy Foundation as a nonprofit arts organization. The foundation is operated by a board of trustees that includes Hunt's close friends, collectors, family members, art professionals, and scholars, including his official biographer, Jon Ott. The foundation has partnered with the Chicago Sculpture Exhibit to offer the bi-annual Richard Hunt Award–a monetary prize given to an emerging or mid-career sculptor to create a work sited in Chicago for two years. The foundation has collaborated closely with the Public Art Archive to document Hunt's extensive public works. Another long-term initiative is compiling a catalogue raisonné of all Hunt's works of art.

== Notable works of art ==
=== Early period (1953–1975) ===
In 1955, Hunt attended the funeral of Emmett Till at the Roberts Temple Church in Chicago. The open-casket funeral showed Till's face, mutilated and disfigured from having been lynched. This experience had a profound impact on Hunt. Till had grown up in Woodlawn only a few blocks from the home where Hunt was born. Hunt, like Till, traveled South to visit family.

Hero's Head, a solemn representation of the disfigured head of Till, was one of the first welded sculptures that Hunt created. He witnessed Till's funeral and taught himself how to weld the very same summer. On January 6, 2003, Hunt also attended Mamie Till's funeral out of reverence for what she did for her child and for the Civil Rights Movement as a whole. The hollow, almost skull-like form of Hero’s Head evokes strong feelings of horror and sorrow.

Curator and historian of African American art, LeRonn P. Brooks writes that "Hero's Head is both an exposition of racism's deadly ends and a critique of the American racial order. It also brings anachronistic and mythological themes often associated with modern abstraction back into the world in the service of civil rights."

Hunt salvaged everyday materials, including a car muffler and two lampshades, and transformed these odds and ends into a sculpture he called Arachne, which is a reference to Ovid's epic poem, Metamorphoses. The figure in Hunt's metallic sculpture resembles a Kafkaesque hybrid of a human and insect.

Dorothy Miller, who was a groundbreaking curator at the Museum of Modern Art in New York (MoMA), saw Arachne in a 1957 exhibition at the Art Institute of Chicago, and helped to get it acquired and exhibited at MoMA just a few months later. Hunt's Arachne inspired the poem "Richard Hunt's 'Arachne'" by Robert Earl Hayden.

In February 1957, Richard Hunt participated in the Chicago Artists No-Jury Exhibition at Navy Pier on Lake Michigan. His sculpture, Steel Bloom, Number 10 was included in the show and received the Pauline Palmer Prize. Steel Bloom, Number 10 is part of Hunt's “Steel Bloom” series, which he created in 1956, shortly after he taught himself how to weld. The welded steel sculpture evokes natural and organic forms.

Plant Form, which is in the collection of the Smithsonian American Art Museum, is an important early example of how Hunt developed a signature style for transforming industrial forms into organic compositions that allude to biomorphic entities. The sculpture is indicative of a mode Hunt called "hybrid figures," described as "a kind of bridge between what we experience in nature and what we experience from the urban, industrial, technology-driven society we live in."

Hunt created Hero Construction one year after graduating from the School of the Art Institute of Chicago. He built the sculpture from found objects, including several mufflers, collected from the street and in metal scrap yards, and welded them together to create a humanoid form with a pose that alludes to a figure of a heroic status. Since 2017, Hero Construction (1958) has stood as the centerpiece of The Art Institute of Chicago.

Hunt displayed Organic Construction with Branching Forms at the Seattle World's Fair exhibition, Art Since 1950 (April 21 to October 21, 1962). He was the youngest artist to exhibit work in that show.

Hunt was awarded the Walter M. Campana Prize from the Art Institute of Chicago for Antique Study after Nike at the 65th American Exhibition. The work is part of Hunt's “Antique Study” series that explored themes of antiquity and some of Hunt's seminal artistic influences such as Auguste Rodin and Umberto Boccioni.

Hunt's Linear Spatial Theme, Number 1 is a welded sculpture composed of chromed steel pipes and automobile parts, created as part of his “Hero” series of works. Inspired by Michelangelo's David, Hunt abstracts the human form both linearly and volumetrically. Linear Spatial Theme, Number 1 was the centerpiece of Richard Hunt's Museum of Modern Art (MoMA) 1971 solo retrospective in New York.

Hunt's work with welded steel sculpture is highlighted by his ability to manipulate the material in order to create organic and dynamic forms. Linear Peregrination is a freestanding steel sculpture from Hunt's "Metamorphoses" series.

Linear Peregrination's organic form stems from his exploration of biological concepts, such as cell division and complex evolutionary processes; and his fascination with mythology. This particular sculpture resembles a bull, alluding to the Greek myth of Europa and the Bull and paying homage to Picasso’s Bull's Head (1942).

Antique Study after Boccioni is composed of welded chrome steel car bumpers sculpted in a way to evoke Boccioni’s Unique Forms of Continuity in Space (1913) in the collection of the Museum of Modern Art. The early 1960s marked a transition in Hunt’s work toward more volumetric works composed of closed forms, which contrasted with his earlier pieces resembling “drawings in space.”

Outgrowth is one of Hunt’s earlier welded aluminum sculptures that juxtaposes a monolithic base with an organic protrusion that alludes to a delicate, branching form. The two components, perfectly counterbalanced, provide visual harmony.

In 1975, Hunt was among several artists who were commissioned by the Container Corporation of America for their “Great Ideas” campaign. He was asked to interpret the writings of an esteemed thinker and make a work in response. Hunt’s lengthy title for the piece he created reflects a sentence from Nathaniel Hawthorne’s 1852 novel, The Blithedale Romance.

Hunt’s work alludes to Hawthorne’s tale about a utopian commune that is ruined by its members' greed and selfishness, as well as the contrasting narratives of life in the city and in the country. Made of chromed and welded steel, it suggests organic growth within the synthetic confines of society. Hunt described the sculpture’s form as evoking "the sense of freedom one has in contemplating nature." This sculpture is in the Smithsonian American Art Museum’s collection.

=== Middle period (1976–2000) ===
In 1977, Hunt finished a maquette for a monumental plaza sculpture outside the Social Security Administration building in Richmond, California. Study for Richmond Cycle consists of two distinct parts, a larger biomorphic form and a smaller one. The theme of the sculpture references the cycle of life and the duality between the weight of experience and the lightness and promise of youth.

Richard Wright’s 1940 novel, Native Son, provided inspiration for Hunt’s sculpture Bigger Bridge which references that novel’s protagonist, Bigger Thomas. Composed of welded chromed steel furniture legs and automobile bumpers, the work takes the shape of a bridge-like arc of steel. This sculpture is now in the collection of the Savannah College of Art and Design Museum of Art.

Slowly Toward the North's abstract form alludes to two distinct forms, the train and push plow. The shape of a steam engine can be discerned via the driving wheels and front-end cowcatcher components. The forms of the steam engine are juxtaposed with stylized handles, plowshare, and wheels of a push plow cultivator. The work is part of Hunt’s “Plow Series,” which he explains, “grew out of my family’s history and childhood experiences on family farms.”

These two major symbolic elements within the large bronze sculpture commemorates the Great Migration. Per Hunt’s instruction, the train elements face north, representing the journey of Black Americans leaving the south for the northern states; while the plow is oriented to the agrarian south, which indicates their laborious work in the fields.

Slowly Toward the North is on view at Crystal Bridges Museum of American Art’s North Forest.

Hunt ties together the organic form in Hybrid Movement. A complex and twisting welded Cor-Ten steel balances on three points. Here, Hunt “captures the implied vitality of animalistic locomotion and the progression of sound through a musical composition.”

Walter O. Evans commissioned Hunt to create Model for a Middle Passage Monument to commemorate the Atlantic slave trade. The “middle passage” was the segment of the Atlantic slave trade that brought newly enslaved Africans to the Americas. The bronze tabletop sculptural model alludes to a large ship-like structure that would serve as a public work commemorating the slave passage from Africa, and is inspired by the 1962 poem “Middle Passage” by Robert Hayden.

Toward a New City reflects Richard Hunt's perspective that art can represent more equitable concepts of society. The circular stainless steel base spirals upwards into two vertical forms intended to symbolize aspiration. Hunt stated that his work focuses on art itself while exploring alternative visions of the future.

In 1995, Hunt completed Steelaway as a tribute to his mother, Etoria Inez Henderson Hunt. The title comes from the African-American spiritual “Steal Away to Jesus,” which refers to the intimate parent-child bond.

Hunt's Flintlock Fantasy or The Promise of Force is a massive 7-foot-tall and 700-pound abstract sculpture with an ominous, foreboding form that calls to mind weapons of war and mass destruction. The impetus behind the work's creation was the start of the Persian War on January 16, 1991.

Growing Forward’s upward-reaching bronze extensions suggest the hybridization of biological growth and civil rights and social progress. In a review of Growing Forward on display at the 1997 Studio Museum in Harlem exhibition of the same name, Sculpture magazine indicated the sculpture “cantilevers off a cliff-like outcropping of shiny bronze, sending muscular arabesques and spiky strands floating over the viewer’s head.”

=== Late period (2001–2023) ===
Hunt pays homage to his African ancestry and personal trips to Egypt in his sculpture, Nile Journey, which is in the collection of the Brauer Museum of Art, Valparaiso University, Valparaiso, Indiana. Nile Journey undulates with currents of bronze in a swirling and wayward fashion in reference to an ancient journey on the Nile, and “gives the impression of a subtly moving tree of gold, befitting the tomb of any pharaoh."

Exhibited at the Art Institute of Chicago in 2021–22, Rampant Heraldry was fashioned after decorative water pitchers from the Middle Ages called aquamaniles, demonstrating the wide array of subject matter and influences covered by Hunt's work.

Out and Further Out represents Hunt's artistic aspiration to push the limits of gravity and material, extending the bronze tendril-like forms horizontally reaching out from a solid columnar base. Hunt described his inspiration for this piece: “I liked the idea of creating this extension rather than having to grow up from the base more vertically. And as a piece that was more improvisational when I started, I was going to have it go out, and I decided I will go further out. I had to do that and gave it that title.”

Planar and Tubular represents Hunt's concept of organic and industrial hybridization in a monumental form, with its hard angular edges on a stacked double trapezoid base transforming into curvilinear, upward-reaching forms created from industrial ducts. Upon installation of the sculpture on the terrace of the Art Institute of Chicago in 2020 for an exhibition, Hunt “mounted a ladder in theatrical fashion and began sanding and polishing the work in rhythmic, circular motions for a live audience in what could have been billed as a sculptural ‘performance.’”

In 2014, Hunt began to create a monumental bronze sculpture, inspired by the forms of scholar’s rocks (gongshi) and the Martin Luther King Jr. memorial in Washington, DC. The piece took six years to complete. It was constructed from large scraps of crumpled bronze material that he received from Revere Copper & Brass.

The three-part title is derived from the formal and figurative elements of the sculpture. Hunt’s travels to China, where he was fascinated by gardens containing gongshi, or scholar’s rocks, influenced the piece’s organic shape. Stone of Hope is the title of the Martin Luther King Jr. sculpture carved in granite by sculptor Lei Yixin. A “love of bronze” is a reference to the actual bronze material used in this particular work of art. Hunt explained that “the Love of Bronze is something that came to mind because on one of those crumpled pieces of metal that I got, the person at Revere had written, ‘Love you, 655.’”

Hunt's Arching and Ascending combines the biblical reference from an earlier and similar welded bronze sculpture, Arching (1985)--God's command to create an arch that stretches across the waters, called Heaven–with his awareness of his own mortality. Hunt completed Arching and Ascending in his final years of his life as he reflected on his art, career, and personal transcendence.

== Public art and monuments ==
Hunt completed more public sculptures than any other sculptor in the country. He also created monuments for some of the United States' greatest heroes, including Martin Luther King Jr., Mary McLeod Bethune, John Jones, Jesse Owens, Ida B. Wells-Barnett, and Hobart Taylor Jr.

Hunt received his first sculpture commission in 1967 known as Play, which was commissioned by the State of Illinois Public Art Program for the John J. Madden Health Center in Maywood, Illinois. Hunt created Play using Cor-Ten steel. This was the first time he used that specific material to create a sculpture. The making of Play led to Hunt receiving many other public commissions, an undertaking that he considered to be his second career.

Play was originally titled The Chase, and is based on the myth of Diana and Actaeon from Ovid's Metamorphoses. Hunt also noted that imagery from 1963, of police dogs chasing civil rights activists in Birmingham, Alabama motivated him to create the sculpture. Hunt completed Play in 1969.

In 1969, Hunt completed a sculpture to honor the abolitionist John Jones, who was the first African American elected to public office in the state of Illinois.

The sculpture's form combines geometric abstraction and representational figuration. Hunt explained that he “used the form like a block growing out of his foot to show the weight he had to bear as a Negro as he climbed. And the other block growing out of his shoulder to show how his burden held him down at the same time he was trying to climb.”

John Jones was initially installed on the campus of the University of Illinois at Chicago Circle. It is currently in the collection of the DuSable Black History Museum and Education Center in Chicago.

Harlem Hybrid is in contrast with the mode of minimalist sculpture that prevailed at the time of its creation. The sculpture's organic shape and form suggests what Hunt describes as the “synthesis of organic and industrial subject matter.”

Jacob’s Ladder is a monumental two-piece welded bronze and brass sculpture, installed in the foyer of the Carter G. Woodson Regional Library on Chicago's South Side. The title of the sculpture references an African American spiritual.

The large work is suspended from the library's ceiling, and is presented in two parts. The base resembles an altar, while the piece at the top features a rolling and ascending ladder.

Hunt said that “This piece leaves wings and angels more to the imagination. It relates to the structure of the building. At the bottom, to involve the whole space in the composition, is a form that is circular, in part, and that reaches up toward the ladder. It suggests a sort of altar that Jacob built after having his dream.”

In 1977, on the occasion of the ninth anniversary of Martin Luther King Jr.’s assassination, Hunt was commissioned by the Mallory Knights Charitable Organization to make a sculpture memorializing his life. I Have Been to the Mountain is situated outdoors at the Dr. Martin Luther King Jr. Reflection Park in downtown Memphis, Tennessee.

The large steel forms of the piece symbolize a mountain range, and a metaphor for King’s activism and message about reaching the archetypal promised land, where Black people will live in peace and have equal rights.

Hunt’s large bronze sculpture, A Bridge Across and Beyond was completed in 1978. It is located at the Blackburn Center on the Howard University campus in Washington, D.C.

The sculpture is surrounded by fountains within a large reflecting pool. Two large pyramid forms bend toward each other. They are symbolic of the African continent and the descendants of Africans in America. The bending of the forms creates a bridge from one pyramid to the other.

In 1978, Hunt completed Symbiosis, which is located at Andrew Carnegie Hall on the Howard University campus in Washington, D.C. Symbiosis was featured in the Smithsonian American Art Museum's nationwide survey, Save Outdoor Sculpture! exhibition in 1993.

Made from Cor-Ten steel, Symbiosis is an abstract sculpture, but it also has biomorphic features resembling a head with appendages. Also called “Bison,” Symbiosis was gifted to Howard University by Hobart Taylor Jr., a former member of the Board of Trustees, in 1981.

In 1981, Hunt sculpted Spirit of Freedom to commemorate the Black men and women who were brought to Kansas City, Missouri as slaves, and later made significant contributions to the city's social and cultural landscape. The sculpture sits on top of a pyramid-like base, with its hybrid organic free form inspired by jazz improvisation. The work of art sits atop a working fountain.

The concept of freedom that the sculpture expresses is twofold. It reflects the trials and tribulations that African-Americans dealt with on their road to obtaining liberation and civil rights, as well as the idea of “freedom of mind, thought, and imagination."

In 1983, the McDonald's Corporation commissioned Hunt to create a work of art for its headquarters in Oak Brook, Illinois. Hunt took inspiration from Martin Luther King Jr.’s 1956 sermon, “The Death of Evil upon the Seashore,” in which King stated that, “There is a Red Sea in history that ultimately comes to carry the forces of goodness to victory, and that same Red Sea closes in to bring doom and destruction to the forces of evil.”

Hunt's six-foot-tall, welded bronze sculpture, From the Sea, resembles the ferocity of the waves of the Red Sea crashing upon and drowning Pharaoh's army in the biblical story of Exodus. The sculpture is no longer on public display.

Build-Grow is a welded stainless steel 13-foot-high sculpture, which resembles a Tree of Life. The piece resides at York College, City University of New York in Jamaica, Queens.

Hunt created Freedmen’s Column in 1989 for the campus of Howard University in Washington, D.C. The sculpture references the legacy of the school's founder Oliver O. Howard, who was commissioner of the Freedmen's Bureau, which was integral in supporting social change during the Reconstruction-era.The obelisk-shaped sculpture features an abstracted form of an eagle perched on top. The figure of the bird was fashioned to appear as if it is about to break free from its steel confines and take flight.

Created as a monument to the life and accomplishments of Mary McLeod Bethune and taking inspiration from Hunt's wife Lenora Cartright, From the Ground Up was commissioned for and installed in the Logan Circle Historic District in Washington, D.C. It was situated blocks away from Mary McLeod Bethune's D.C. home. Bethune was revered in the Hunt home. The sculpture contains a long sword fashioned from welded bronze piercing the sky that recalls Bethune's famous quote, “If our people are to fight their way up out of bondage we must arm them with the sword and the shield and the buckler of pride.” The sculpture is no longer on public display.

In 1989, Hunt sculpted Eagle Columns, which sits on the corner of Jonquil Park, across from where Hunt worked in his Lincoln Park Chicago studio. A nearby elevated subway line (the “L”) offers a good vantage point for commuters to experience the sculpture.

Standing tall at 30 feet, Eagle Columns consists of three columnar sculptures fixed on a geometric base.

This public sculpture honors John Peter Altgeld (1847–1902), who served as Illinois governor from 1893 to 1897 and made significant contributions to social reform. Altgeld pardoned three men who were wrongly convicted of bombing during the 1886 Haymarket Affair labor protest. His pardoning of the men jeopardized his reelection bid, but led to him being considered a hero of the labor movement. The title of Hunt's sculpture draws inspiration from Illinois poet Vachel Lindsay’s (1879–1931) poem, “The Eagle That Is Forgotten,” which praised Altgeld for inspiring the spark that uplifted those fighting for fair labor practices everywhere."

Hunt created another Build-Grow sculpture in 1992 for the Connolly Plaza Metro Center in Washington, D.C. The large bronze sculpture is a part of a large, immersive installation of sculptures by Hunt, Four Growth Columns and Swan Column. To get to Build-Grow, visitors navigate through a grove of tall columns. Art historian Andrew Wasserman writes that, “The dual commands of the title Build-Grow are directed not just at the metal. They are directed at the viewer as well, who are, themselves, intended to participate in the process of realizing a more capacious civic body and more equitable world.”

Commissioned by United States Steel Corp., Steel Garden was sculpted for installation at the former site of steel mills on the South Side of Chicago. The 22-foot-tall stainless steel work alludes to the juxtaposition of nature and growth, as well as industrialization and the subsequent job creation that steel mills provided to southern Blacks that moved north during the Great Migration.

Swing Low, a massive 30-foot-wide bronze sculpture, hangs from the ceiling of the National Museum of African American History and Culture. Completed in 2016, it is a monument to the African American Spiritual and “their defining place in early colored religious, social and cultural self-consciousness” through the sculpture's “wing-like forms” as a “band of angels.”

In 2017, Hunt completed Spiral Odyssey, a nearly 30-foot-tall, welded stainless steel sculpture for Romare Bearden Park in Charlotte, North Carolina.

Hunt created Spiral Odyssey in tribute to his friend Romare Bearden, whose iconic series, “Black Odyssey” reinterpreted Homer's epic poem; and who was a co-founder of an artists collective during the civil rights era known as the Spiral Group. The form of the sculpture symbolizes elements from Bearden's legacy, as well as the resilient journey of Black Americans.

In 2021, Hunt created a 35-foot-tall monument for civil rights activist and investigative journalist Ida B. Wells-Barnett, which is located in the Bronzeville neighborhood on the South Side of Chicago, nearby where Wells lived. The Light of Truth Ida B. Wells National Monument derives its name from Wells’ quote, “The way to right wrongs is to turn the light of truth upon them.”

A documentary film called The Light of Truth: Richard Hunt’s Monument to Ida B. Wells was released on October 27, 2024. The film, directed by Rana Segal, documents Hunt's artistic process, and the integration of public art and social activism.

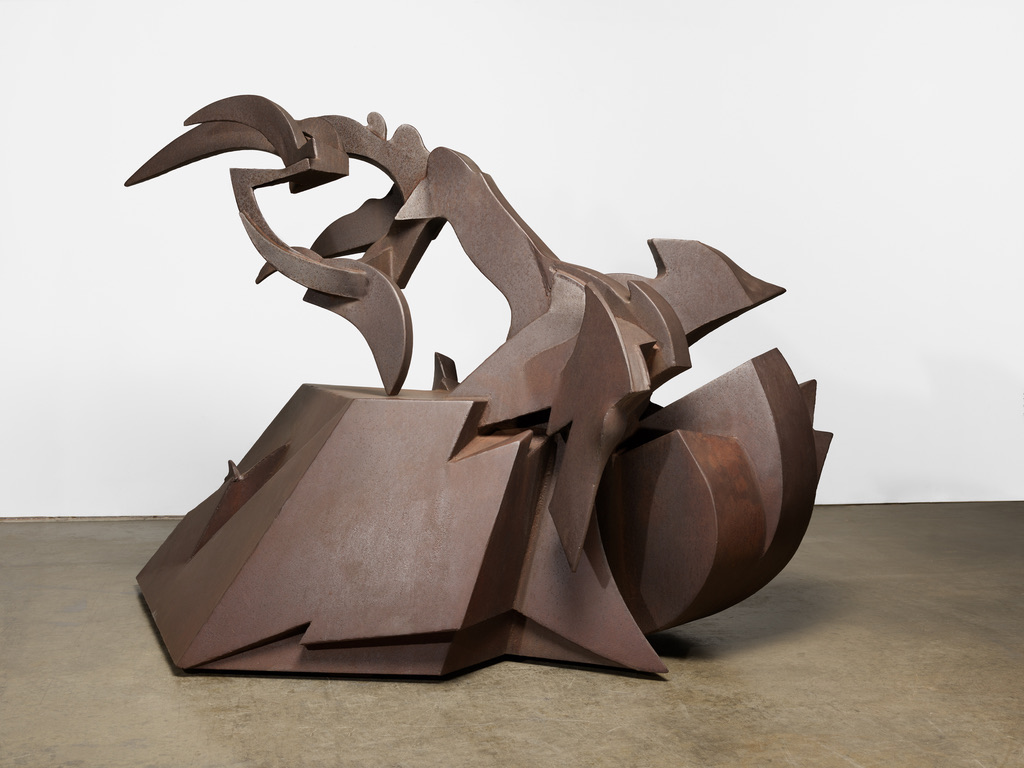
Slowly Toward the North, 1984, welded Cor-Ten steel, 59"H × 34"W × 84"D (150 × 86 × 213 cm). The sculpture commemorates the Great Migration.

On February 26, 2022, the Obama Foundation announced the commission of the sculpture Book Bird for the Barack Obama Presidential Center. The sculpture which was completed, is an elaboration from a piece Hunt created as an award to supporters of the United Negro College Fund. The Obama Foundation stated, "This beautiful piece encapsulates the progress one can make through reading—embodying the inspiration we hope all young people take away when they visit the Obama Presidential Center." Barack Obama told Hunt, "I've been a huge admirer of your work for a long time, and Michelle has as well."

In 2023, Hunt finished a sculptural model for the monument Hero Ascending, a tribute to Emmett Till which will be installed at Till's childhood home.

== Works on Paper ==
In addition to his sculpture, Hunt made a large number of drawings, paintings, lithographs, and screen prints throughout his career. One lithograph, Prometheus (1956) was made around the same time that he completed his Hero’s Head sculpture. Like the sculpture, the theme of Prometheus was spurred on by Emmet Till’s lynching. The Greek myth of Prometheus, who brought civilization to humans by stealing fire from the gods, leading to him being eternally condemned by Zeus, is a metaphor for Till’s suffering at the hands of white supremacy.

In 1965, Hunt was a resident artist at the Tamarind Lithography Workshop in Los Angeles, where he worked with master printer Kenneth Tyler, and produced a series of 8 lithographs which he titled Details.

Many of Hunt’s works on paper showcase his “unique approach to creating flat, two-dimensional prints that allude to his sculptural processes and interest in surreal-like skeletal structures.”

== Awards and accolades ==
Hunt has received many distinguished honors during his lifetime and posthumously.

Illinois First Lady MK Pritzker proclaimed April 24, 2023 to be “Richard Hunt Day” in Illinois, to celebrate his life's achievements and recognize Hunt as one of the United States’ preeminent sculptors.

Hunt received numerous awards throughout his career, including the Mr. and Mrs. Frank G. Logan Medal and Prize, Art Institute of Chicago three times (1956, 1961, and 1962). He received the James N. Raymond Foreign Traveling Fellowship in 1957, which supported his travels to England, France, Spain, and Italy. In 1962, he was awarded a Guggenheim Fellowship; a Tamarind Fellowship (awarded under the auspices of the Ford Foundation) in 1965; a Cassandra Foundation Award in 1970; a James Van Der Zee Lifetime Achievement Award (Brandywine Workshop and Archives) in 1980; an Artists Award from The Studio Museum in Harlem in 1990; a Lifetime Achievement Award from the International Sculpture Center in 2009; a Lifetime Achievement Award from Howard University in 2014; an Alain Locke International Art Award, Detroit Institute of Arts in 2015; and the Chicago Public Library Foundation Arts Award and Dorsky Lifetime Achievement Award from the Samuel Dorsky Museum of Art in 2023.

In 1998, Hunt became a member of the American Academy of Arts and Letters, and in 1999, he became a member of the National Academy of Design.

In 2014, Hunt was among the first recipients of the Fifth Star Awards, which honor Chicago-based artists whose careers have had a profound impact on the city's cultural life.

On June 9, 2022, Hunt was honored with the Art Institute of Chicago's Legends and Legacy Award, and the city of Chicago declared that date as “Richard Hunt Day.”

In October 2026, a three-story mural depicting Hunt created by Chicago artist Chris Devins was installed in Hunt's honor at 1515-19 E. 54th Street in Chicago.

== Exhibitions ==
Hunt's work has been displayed in museums and galleries throughout the United States and abroad.

Hunt had his first New York City solo exhibition in 1958 at Alan Gallery, directed by gallerist Charles Alan. The exhibition received a positive review by Dore Ashton in the New York Times, who wrote that “In his carefully finished compositions there is a graceful continuity. Larger volumes are balanced by soaring, tapered lines, or an asymmetrical axis supports the suggestion of radiating forms in transition.” Hunt had subsequent exhibitions at Alan Gallery in 1960 and 1963.

Richard Hunt's first solo show on the west coast was in 1965 at the Felix Landau Gallery in Los Angeles, California. In a review published in Artforum magazine, critic Fidel A. Danieli wrote, “The eye is forced to survey slowly, so controlled and serious are his statements. Empathy is all. Set are the motifs of linear linkage, a tidy concern for detail and appropriate terminating endings, and his blending of mechanical and organic vocabularies.”

Hunt's first solo exhibition in 1962 at B.C. Holland Gallery (formerly Holland-Goldowsky Gallery) in Chicago featured numerous early masterworks that represented his drawing-in-space calligraphic style, as well as his transition into more substantial forms–a change described as “refreshing” by Herbert Pannier in a Chicago Tribune review of the show. Hunt had subsequent solo exhibitions in 1963, 1966, 1968, 1970, and 1976 at B.C. Holland Gallery.

Richard Hunt's first retrospective solo exhibition was held at the Milwaukee Art Center in Milwaukee, Wisconsin in 1967. John Lloyd Talor, director of exhibitions and collections at the time,wrote of the show: “Perhaps not since David Smith, with whose work Hunt maintains strong affinity, has a sculptor so successfully handled the problems of form volumetrically within the mass of sculptural space.”

Hunt's work has been exhibited 11 times at the Museum of Modern Art in New York, including a major solo retrospective in 1971, when he was only 35 years old, titled The Sculpture of Richard Hunt (March 25 – July 9, 1971). He was the first African American sculptor to be given a retrospective by MoMA. A photograph of Hunt's 1956 sculpture Arachne was used for the cover of the exhibition catalogue.

In his review of the Richard Hunt MoMA retrospective, art critic Hilton Kramer acclaims Richard Hunt as a “virtuoso practitioner” of “open-form sculpture” and regarded within Hunt's work “a certain violence of feeling [which] is sublimated in a very taught and elegant sculptural calligraphy…In the presence of this work, we feel ourselves to be in the presence of the artist’s inner life.”

Richard Hunt: Growing Forward was an exhibition that began at the Snite Museum of Art (now the Raclin Murphy Museum of Art) in 1996, and traveled to the Studio Museum in Harlem in 1997. The exhibition highlighted his welded sculptures from the 1980s - 1990s, along with a selection of works on paper, and featured a major catalogue, Richard Hunt: Growing Forward.

The inaugural year of the Charles H., Wright Museum of African American History (1998) included a retrospective Richard Hunt exhibition, which featured Hunt's Flintlock Fantasy or a Promise of Force (1991–1996). The museum published a major exhibition catalogue by the same title, Richard Hunt: Affirmations, with an essay by curator Horace Brockington.

The Art Institute of Chicago has featured Hunt's work with two prominent solo exhibitions. The first was Hunt's retrospective from August 21 to October 4, 1971, The Sculpture of Richard Hunt, which traveled from MoMA.

The second exhibition was titled Richard Hunt: Scholar’s Rock or Stone of Hope or Love of Bronze in 2020–2021. The latter show was named after a very large bronze sculpture of the same name that Hunt began in 2014 and finished in 2020. The sculpture was the centerpiece of the exhibition, which also featured two large-scale stainless steel sculptures, and a selection of smaller-scaled bronzes.

In 2014, the Chicago Cultural Center celebrated Hunt's career to date with the retrospective exhibition Richard Hunt: Sixty Years of Sculpture. The 60 works of art featured in the major survey exhibition dated from 1954 to 2014.

Hunt turned eighty in 2015, and to celebrate the occasion, the Museum of Contemporary Art (Chicago) honored his life and artistic career with the exhibition, MCA DNA: Richard Hunt, featuring sculptures and drawings dating from the 1950s through the 1990s.

From late 2016 into early 2017, the Studio Museum in Harlem organized the exhibition Richard Hunt: Framed and Extended. The exhibition displayed a variety of work from throughout Hunt's career, with a specific focus on printmaking, small-scale sculpture, and wall sculpture.

Hunt's 2018 retrospective exhibition at the Georgia Museum of Art focused on sculptures from the 1950s through 2018, as well as works on paper. The art museum published an exhibition catalogue, Richard Hunt: Synthesis, to accompany the exhibition.

In 2022, an exhibition at Norton Simon Museum featured Hunt's two-dimensional graphic renderings of organic and three-dimensional forms, which he completed during a residency at the Tamarind Lithography Workshop in Los Angeles in 1965. The exhibition titled, Richard Hunt: Details, exhibited a selection of the prints that Hunt made at Tamarind, showing how lithography supplemented and extended his interests as a sculptor.

From October 2022 to February 2023, fifty metal sculptures were exhibited within KANEKO's 8,000 square-foot gallery space in Omaha, Nebraska. The survey exhibition focused on works created after 1970, when Hunt started to increasingly concentrate on large-scale sculpture and public art commissions. The sculpture, Planar and Tubular (2012–2020) was also on display at Omaha's River Front public park during the exhibition. The concept of monumentality in Hunt's work extends beyond the tangible size of his sculpture and exemplifies the major impact of Hunt's subject matter and broad range of influences that connect the histories of art, modern urban life, and the African American experience. The exhibition featured a major exhibition catalogue by the same title, Richard Hunt: Monumental.

In November 2023, White Cube announced representation of Richard Hunt and an exhibition of his work at their New York gallery.

Richard Hunt's major exhibition at White Cube New York in the spring of 2024, focused on the formative period of 1955 through 1969, when he established himself as a leading American artist. The exhibition was a triumphant presentation of Hunt's work in New York City. Critic Jessica Holmes notes Hunt's expanding legacy in a review in Brooklyn Rail, “Sculptures that easily could be conversant with the likes of Alexander Calder, Anthony Caro, or David Smith were perhaps overlooked the first time around because Hunt was Black, and the art world has long bypassed equally talented artists of color who were always there, working among their better-known white peers. Early Masterworks offers the beginnings of a corrective to this myopic oversight.”

In addition to his more familiar work as a sculptor, the Madison Museum of Contemporary Art's 2024-2025 exhibition, Line to Form: Richard Hunt’s Prints and Sculpture features a wide selection of Hunt's prints from the 1970s.

On view through March 2, 2025 at the Amon Carter Museum of American Art in Fort Worth, Texas, Richard Hunt: From Paper to Metal features a series of prints Hunt created at the Tamarind Lithography Workshop in 1965. Twenty-five prints from the museum's collection are shown together with Hunt's large chromed steel sculpture, Natural Form (1968). The pairing shows how Hunt's two-dimensional and three-dimensional work share a unique aesthetic dialogue of organic forms, scale, and open space.

In the fall of 2024, an extensive survey exhibition, curated by Ross Stanton Jordan, was mounted at the Abraham Lincoln Presidential Library and Museum in Springfield, Illinois. “'We never intended for this to be a legacy show,' said Lance Tawzer, director of exhibits and shows" there. The idea had come in 2019 and the museum had hoped to open it in Hunt's lifetime. In July 2025, it moved to the Loyola University Museum of Art.

The exhibition combines art, archives, and artifacts from Hunt's life and career, with a focus on his contribution to the Civil Rights Movement, as well as his status as one of the major 20th century American artists. Alongside works of art are Hunt's personal library, tools, and video interviews.

== Museum holdings, public collections, and gallery representation ==
Hunt's artworks are in the collection of major museums across the United States. The Smithsonian has twenty-one of his works, including the large bronze sculpture, Swing Low, which is prominently located, suspended from the ceiling of Heritage Hall in the Smithsonian National Museum of African American History and Culture.

Other numerous notable museums with holdings of Hunt's work include the Art Institute of Chicago (Chicago, IL), Albright-Knox Art Gallery (Buffalo, NY), Allen Memorial Art Museum, (Oberlin College, Oberlin, OH), Amon Carter Museum of American Art (Fort Worth, TX), Baltimore Museum of Art (Baltimore, MD), Birmingham Museum of Art (Birmingham, AL), Brooklyn Museum (Brooklyn, NY), the British Museum (London, UK), the Butler Institute of American Art (Youngstown, OH), The Dayton Art Institute, (Dayton, OH), de Young Museum, Fine Arts Museums of San Francisco (San Francisco, CA), Glenstone, (Potomac, MD), High Museum of Art (Atlanta, GA), the Museum of Modern Art (New York, NY), The Israel Museum (Jerusalem), [citation] Laumeier Sculpture Park (Sappington, MO), Los Angeles County Museum of Art (Los Angeles, CA), McNay Art Museum (San Antonio, TX), The Metropolitan Museum of Art (New York, NY), Museum of Contemporary Art (Chicago, IL), Museum of Fine Arts (Boston, MA), Norton Simon Museum (Pasadena, CA) Storm King Art Center, Mountainville, NY, The Studio Museum in Harlem (New York, NY), Obama Presidential Center (Chicago, IL), Smithsonian American Art Museum (Washington, DC), Speed Art Museum (Louisville, KY), and the Whitney Museum of American Art (New York, NY).

The Getty Research Institute acquired the archive of Richard Hunt in October 2022. The Richard Hunt archive contains approximately 800 linear feet of detailed notes and correspondence, notebooks, sketchbooks, photographic documentation, financial records, research, ephemera, blueprints, posters, drawings, and lithographs, as well as a selection of wax models for public sculptures. "Richard Hunt is one of the foremost American artists of the mid- to late-20th century," says LeRonn Brooks, associate curator for modern and contemporary collections. "I am thrilled that Getty, whom I first became affiliated with through my participation in the Getty Center for Education in the Arts during the 1980s, will be the home of my archive," says Richard Hunt. "The entirety of my papers, photographs, letters, and sketches trace the arc of my career and my contribution to art history. I hope that my archive will serve not only as a remembrance but an inspiration to others."

In November 2023, White Cube announced its representation of Richard Hunt, and an exhibition of his work at its New York gallery. In December 2023, the gallery showed his work at Art Basel Miami Beach. The sculpture Years of Pilgrimage (1999) sold for $1.2 million during the first twenty minutes of the VIP preview.

Gallery director Sukanya Rajaratnam proclaimed that “Richard has been a giant hiding in plain sight for decades…his ability to thread the history of twentieth-century sculpture, with his own deeply personal experience as a Black man is nothing short of profound.”

A solo exhibition is planned for White Cube's Bermondsey location in 2025.

== Personal life ==
Hunt married his first wife, Bettye Scott in 1957. She was a former fellow student at the Art Institute of Chicago. In 1962, the couple had a daughter, Cecilia Elizabeth Hunt. Scott and Hunt divorced in 1966. In 1976, People magazine reported that “Hunt is much in demand in Chicago Society, though his reputation for being late is so notorious that hostesses never have sit-down dinners when he is a guest, only buffets.” Hunt was married to his second wife Lenora Cartright in 1983, until her death, from breast cancer in 1989. Cartright was a former dean at the University of Illinois who had also served under Chicago mayors Jane Byrne and Harold Washington as a city official. Hunt's third and final marriage was to Anuschka Menist, a Dutch dealer in African art. That marriage ended in divorce less than a decade later.

Richard Hunt was regarded by his peers and the art community as an intellectual, humble artist. He was generous with his time with studio visitors and attended art events and functions throughout his life. Upon his passing, the School of the Art Institute of Chicago remarked, “Richard Hunt will be remembered as a generous mentor, incessant maker, humble talent, and inspirational man.”

== Death ==
Hunt died on December 16, 2023, at his Chicago home. According to a statement posted to his website, he "passed away peacefully". He was 88. President Obama spent time with Hunt to pay respects just before Hunt's passing.

Hunt's remains are interred at Oak Woods Cemetery in Chicago alongside his second wife, Lenora Cartright. A sculptural grave marker he designed as a maquette, called Spirits Ascending will be completed by his studio, as a large bronze memorial, and placed at the gravesite.

Kevin Young, the Andrew W. Mellon Director of the Smithsonian's National Museum of African American History and Culture (NMAAHC), released a statement about Richard Hunt following his death stating, “Hunt's stature and impact cannot be overstated.”

== Bibliography and Filmography ==
=== Newspaper, magazine, and journal articles ===
Hunt is the subject of hundreds of newspaper, magazine, and journal articles. Some notable sources include:

- Speyer, A. James. "Art News from Chicago." Art News, n. 56, March 1957, p. 50.
- Ashton, Dore. "Art: Welding New Forms." New York Times, 30 September 1958, p. 27.
- Burckhardt, Edith. "Richard Hunt." Art News, n. 57, November 1958, p. 19.
- Sawin, Martica. "Richard Hunt." Arts Magazine,n. 33, November 1958, p. 55.
- Kramer, Hilton. "Month in Review." Arts Magazine 33, June 1959, pp. 49–50.
- Ashton, Dore. "New American Sculpture." XXe siècle (Paris) Christmas 1960. pp. 85–91.
- Johnston, Jill. "Richard Hunt, Yutaka Ohashi and Nathan Oliveira." Art News, n. 61, April 1962, p. 18.
- Raynor, Vivien. "Yutaka Ohashi, Richard Hunt, Nathan Oliveira." Arts Magazine, n. 36, April 1962, pp. 52–53.
- “A Red-Hot Hundred,” Life, 14 September 1962.
- Lee, Sherman E. "Year in Review 1962." The Bulletin of the Cleveland Museum of Art, n. 49, November 1962, pp. 209, 227.
- Kramer, Hilton. “Art,” The Nation, 23 March 1963. Reprinted in: Kramer, Hilton. The Age of the Avant-Garde: An Art Chronicle of 1956- 1972. New York: Farrar, Straus and Giroux, 1973. pp. 452–454.
- S., L.H. "Richard Hunt." Art News, n.62, April 1963, p. 50.
- Henning, Edward B. "In Pursuit of Content." The Bulletin of the Cleveland Museum of Art, n. 50, October 1963, p. 238.
- Schulze, Franz. "Art News from Chicago." Art News, n. 62, January 1964, p. 54.
- "Fifty-Six Painters and Sculptors." Art in America, n. 52, August 1964, pp. 22–79.
- Danieli, Fidel A. “Richard Hunt: Felix Landau Gallery,” Artforum, n.3, February 1965. P.39
- Halstead, Whitney. "Chicago." Artforum, n. 4, June 1966, p. 57.
- Schwartz, Donald M. "Portrait of the Artist as a Lonely Man." Chicago Sun-Times Magazine, 14 August 1966, pp. 30–32, 34, 37.
- Key, Donald. “Richard Hunt: A Decade of Distinguished Creative Expression” Art Scene, November 1967, pp. 25–27.
- "Stuffed Moose & Stacked Tibias." Time, 1 December 1967, pp. 96, 99.
- Burroughs, Margaret. "To Make a Poet Black." The Art Gallery Ivoryton, Connecticut, April 1968, pp. 37–39.
- Greene, Carroll, Jr. "The Afro-American Artist." The Art Gallery Ivoryton, Connecticut, April 1968, pp. 12–25.
- Kramer, Hilton. "Sculpture above the Fashions." New York Times, 18 May 1968, p. 29.
- Burton, Scott. "Richard Hunt." Art News, n. 67, Summer 1968, pg. 15,18.
- Greene, Carroll, Jr. "Afro-American Artists: Yesterday and Now." The Humble Way Houston, Fall 1968, pp. 10–15.
- Glueck, Grace. "Negroes' Art is What's In Just Now." New York Times, 27 February 1969, p. 34.
- Ghent, Henri. "Richard Hunt." School Arts Boston, April 1969, p. 26.
- “He Seeks the ‘Soul’ in Metal”. Ebony, April 1969, pp. 80–82, 84, 86, 88.
- “The Black Artist in America: A Symposium,” The Metropolitan Museum of Art, January 1969, pp. 245–261.
- Kramer, Hilton. "Art: A Bounty of Modern Sculpture." The New York Times, 19 April 1969, p. 29
- Schjeldahl, Peter. "A Triumph Rather Than a Threat." New York Times, 27 April 1969, pp. 33, 35.
- Lanes, Jerrold. "Current and Forthcoming Exhibitions." Burlington Magazine, n. 111, June 1969, p. 406.
- Campbell, Lawrence. "Richard Hunt." Art News n. 68, Summer 1969, p. 16.
- Feldman, A]nita. "Richard Hunt." Arts Magazine, n. 43, Summer 1969, p. 68.
- Schjeldahl, Peter. "New York Letter." Art International, n.13, October 1969, p. 77.
- Bruner, Louise. "Black Art." The Blade Toledo, 13 September 1970, pp. 28–29, 32–35.
- “Art–Object: Diversity,” Time, vol. 95, no. 14, 6 April 1970.
- Lee, Sherman E. "The Year in Review for 1969." The Bulletin of the Cleveland Museum of Art, n. 57, January 1970, pp. 26, 50.
- Kramer, Hilton. “Hunt Show has 50 Sculptures, Drawings and Prints”. The New York Times, 24 March 1971.
- Ries, Martin. "Richard Hunt." Arts Magazine, n. 48, May 1974, p. 67.
- Weissman, Julian. "Richard Hunt." Art News, n. 75, February 1976, p. 116.
- Morrison, C.L. "Richard Hunt." Artforum, n. 15, October 1976, p. 69.
- Buonagurio, Edgar. "Richard Hunt." Arts Magazine, n. 52, January 1978, p. 33.
- Fisher, Jay McKean. Prints by a Sculptor: Richard Hunt. Baltimore: Baltimore Museum of Art, 1979.
- Cohen, Ronny. "Richard Hunt." Art News, n.82, May 1983, p. 160.
- "The Arts: Black-American Breakthroughs." Ebony, August 1983, pp. 180–182.
- Baker, Kenneth. "Richard Hunt." Art in America, n. 72, October 1984, pp. 193–194.
- Lewis, Samella. "Richard Hunt." The International Review of African American Art, n. 7, 1987, pp. 16–25.
- "Black Art." The Black Collegian, n. 18, November - December 1987, pp. 58–60.
- Rubenfeld, Richard. "An Interview with Richard Hunt." Mosaics Eastern Michigan University, Ypsilanti, n.3, Fall-Winter 1987–1988), pp. 2–9.
- Getlein, Frank. “Combining the Root with the Reach of Black Aspiration”. Smithsonian, vol. 21, no. 4. July 1990, pp. 60–71.
- "Library's New Sculpture Bridges Wisdom Gap." Atlanta This Week, 4 August 1990, p. 1
- Buczinsky, Teresa. "Richard Hunt." New Art Examiner, n. 18, December 1990, p. 41.
- Kramer, Hilton. "Segregated IBM Show Sullies Hunt and Gilliam." New York Magazine, February 22, 1993.
- Ebony, David. "Richmond Barth and Richard Hunt at the Anacostia Museum." Art in America, n. 81, July 1993, p. 109.
- Curtis, James. "Richmond Barth, Richard Hunt." Art News, n. 93, March 1994, pp. 146–147.
- Auer, James. "Industrial and Organic." The Milwaukee Journal, n. 244, July 1994, Sect. E. pp. 1, 8.
- Weinraub, Judith. "First Lady Finds Niche for Art." The Washington Post, 12 October 1994, Sect. C., pp. 1, 12.
- Zwick, Rosemary. "The Importance of Art." The Evanston Beacon/Forum, n. 9 November 1994, p. 1.
- Drell, Adrienne. "Sculptor Richard Hunt: Even his Trash is Art." Chicago Sun-Times, 27 November 1994. Sect. B., p. 16.
- Cummings, Paul. "Interview: Richard Hunt Talks with Paul Cummings." Drawing, n.16, November - December 1994, pp. 78–81.
- Hoger, Dave. "Personal 'Victory': Sculptor of JCC Piece Combines Pastoral, Urban Influences." Jackson Citizen Patriot, 23 April 1995, Sect. C, pp. 1–2.
- Glueck, Grace. "Metal Sculptures Bucking the Trends." New York Times, 3 January 1997, Sect. B.
- Payne, Les, “The Life and Art of Richard Hunt.” Newsday, 9 January 1997, pp. 6–7, 23.
- Brockington, Horace, "Richard Hunt, The Studio Museum in Harlem," Review, 15 January 1997, pp. 10–12.
- Schmerler, Sarah (October 1997). "Richard Hunt, The Studio Museum in Harlem". Sculpture, pp. 54–55.
- Castro, Jan Garden, "Richard Hunt: Freeing the Human Soul". Sculpture, May–June 1998, pp. 34–39.
- Finn, David et al. 20th Century American Sculpture in the White House Garden. H.N. Abrams, 2000.
- Loving, Charles R., “Richard Hunt: Voyage Through Modernism,” Sculpture, vol. 28, no. 3, April 2009, pp. 24–29.
- MacMillan, Kyle. “Richard Hunt, Andy Warhol featured in art exhibitions slated for Chicago’s fall Season," Chicago Sun-Times, 14 September 2020.
- Rinck, Jonathan. "Richard Hunt," Sculpture Magazine, 9 February 2021.
- Valentine, Victoria L., "The 18 Best Black Art Books of 2022," Culture Type, 3 January 2023.
- Colvin, Rob. "Never Not a Success," Arts Magazine, 23 February 2023.
- Rabb, Maxwell. "American sculptor Richard Hunt is now represented by White Cube," Artsy, 16 November 2023.
- Solomon, Tessa. "White Cube Now Represents Richard Hunt, Totemic American Sculptor of the 20th Century," ARTNews, 16 November 2023
- Holliday, Andrea. “In the Cathedral of Sculpture: The Last Days and Years of Richard Hunt,” New City Art, 1 February 2024.
- Thalberg, Lisbeth. "Richard Hunt: Early Masterworks – White Cube, New York," Martin Cid Magazine 24 February 2024.
- Gideon, Vic. "Cuyahoga County Justice Center sculpture by famous Black artist to receive rededication," 19 News, 28 February 2024.
- Hinton, Rachel. "Remembering Richard Hunt, The Legendary Sculptor Who Inspired Artists In Chicago And Beyond," Block Club Chicago, 29 February 2024.
- Iqbal, Mawa, "Prolific Chicago sculptor Richard Hunt’s works are now on display at Springfield museum," WBEZ, 3 December 2024.
- Gorner, Jeremy. "Springfield museum highlights Chicago sculptor Richard Hunt’s Work," Chicago Tribune, 28 December 2024.
- Levitt, Aimee and Cardoza, Kerry. "Rewind: Chicago sculptor Richard Hunt's six-decade career gets two concurrent exhibits," Chicago Reader, 23, December, 2024.
- Rockett, Darcel. "The Chicago Public Library Foundation honors Richard Hunt with an Art Award. We talk with the artist about his career," The Chicago Tribune, 12 March 2024.
- Boehringer, Emeline. "Universal Freedom: A Review of Richard Hunt at White Cube in New York," Newcity, 20 March 2024.
- Gamboa, Carlota. "Experience the Weightlessness of Richard Hunt's Early Works at White Cube", Art & Object, 8 April 2024.
- Holmes, Jessica. "Richard Hunt: Early Masterworks," The Brooklyn Rail, April 2024.

=== Books ===
Hunt's work, career, and life have been written about in numerous full-length books, including:

- Dover, Cedric. American Negro Art, New York Graphic Society 1960, pp. 55–56, 142, 145.
- Contemporary Art: Acquisitions, 1959–1961. Foreword by Gordon M. Smith. Buffalo, New York: Buffalo Fine Arts Academy, Albright-Knox Art Gallery, 1961. pp. 10, 55.
- Contemporary Sculpture, The Art Digest Inc., 1965.
- Meilach, Dona and Seiden, Donald. Direct Metal Sculpture: Creative Techniques and Appreciation, 1966.
- Ashton, Dore. Modern American Sculpture. New York: Harry Abrams, 1968. p. 37, pl.XXXI.
- Adams, Russell L. Great Negroes Past and Present, 3rd ed, Afro-Am Publishing Company, Inc., 1969, pp. 203.
- Fine, Elsa Honig. The Afro-American Artist: A Search for Identity, Hacker Art Books, 1982.
- Patton, Sharon F. African-American Art. Oxford: Oxford University Press, 1998. pp. 212, 218, 231–232, figs. 111, 112.
- Barnwell, Andrea D. The Walter O. Evans Collection of African American Art, University of Washington Press, 1999.
- Zorach, Rebecca, Art for People’s Sake: Artists and Community in Black Chicago, 1965-1975, Duke University Press, 2019.
- Cahan, Susan E. Mounting Frustration: The Art Museum in the Age of Black Power, Duke University Press, 2016.
- English, Darby. 1971: A Year in the Life of Color, The University of Chicago Press, 2016.
- English, Darby and Barat, Charlotte. Among Others: Blackness at MoMA, Museum of Modern Art, 2019.
- Black Refractions, The Studio Museum in Harlem, 2019.
- Fisher, Lewis F., Brackenridge: San Antonio’s Acclaimed Urban Park, Maverick Books / Trinity University Press, 2022.

=== Film ===
Hunt and his work have been the subject of feature-length films and film and television segments, including:

Five African American Artists

Directed by Dom Albi and released by Silvermine Films in 1971, Five African American Artists features the work of Barbara Chase Riboud, Charles White, Romare Bearden, Richard Hunt, and Betty Blayton. In the short film, each artist candidly discusses their artistic process, inspirations and the cultural landscape of the 1970s.

The Light of Truth: Richard Hunt's Monument to Ida B. Wells The Light of Truth: Richard Hunt's Monument to Ida B. Wells is a 2024 feature-length documentary film, directed by Rana Segal, about Richard Hunt's public sculpture honoring the life and achievements of civil rights activist Ida B. Wells-Barnett. The film was released on October 27, 2024.

=== Exhibition catalogs ===
The following exhibition catalogs have been published in conjunction with solo museum and gallery exhibitions of Hunt's art:

- Richard Hunt: Synthesis (2025), Georgia Museum of Art (Second edition).
- Richard Hunt: Early Masterworks (2024), White Cube.
- Freedom in Form: Richard Hunt (2024), Abraham Lincoln Presidential Library and Museum.
- Richard Hunt: Monumental (2023), KANEKO.
- Richard Hunt: Synthesis (2018), Georgia Museum of Art.
- Sculpting a Chicago Artist, Richard Hunt and his Teachers: Nelli Bar and Egon Weiner (2018), Koehnline Museum of Art, Oakton Community College.
- The Public Life of Richard Hunt: 21st Century Projects (2015), Krasl Art Center.
- Richard Hunt: The Art of This Century (2013), Marshall M. Fredericks Sculpture Museum.
- Richard Hunt: Extending Form (2012), Snite Museum of Art.
- Richard Hunt: Mutable Currency Past and Present (2012), McCormick Gallery.
- Richard Hunt: Wings (2001), William A. Koehnline Gallery, Oakton Community College.
- Richard Hunt: American Visionary (2000), Frederik Meijer Gardens and Sculpture Park.
- Richard Hunt: Affirmations (1998), International Arts & Artists.
- Richard Hunt: Growing Forward (1996), Studio Museum of Harlem.
- Richard Hunt: Contemporary Master of Sculpture (1993), Nevada Museum of Art.
- Richard Hunt: Recent Sculpture (1991), Louis Newman Galleries.
- Richard Hunt: Public Sculptures (1991), The Charles H. Wright Museum of African American History.
- Richard Hunt: Past, Present, Future (1990), Kalamazoo Institute of Arts.
- Richard Hunt (1989), Dorsky Gallery.
- Richard Hunt: Sculpture (1988), Waterloo Center for the Arts.
- Richard Hunt: Sculptures et dessins (1987), Exposition Organized by the Museum of African and American Art, Los Angeles
- Outside In: Public Sculpture by Richard Hunt (1986), Columbia College Art Gallery.
- Richard Hunt (1981), Maui Unity Art Museum
- Richard Hunt: Sculpture, Drawings, Prints (1979), Azalee Marshall Cultural Activities Center.
- Richard Hunt: Sculptures: 1962-1979 (1979), Wichita Art Museum.
- Richard Hunt: Mountain Flight and Selected Works (1978), Greenville County Museum of Art.
- The Sculpture of Richard Hunt (1977), Illinois State Museum.
- Richard Hunt: Sculptures, Drawings, and Prints (1976), Sears Bank and Trust Co.
- Richard Hunt: Selected Sculpture (1975), The University of Iowa Museum of Art.
- Inside with Richard Hunt (1973), Oklahoma Art Center.
- Richard Hunt: Sculpture (1973), Indianapolis Museum of Art.
- The Sculpture of Richard Hunt (1971), Museum of Modern Art.
- Richard Hunt (1967), Milwaukee Art Center.
- Richard Hunt Sculpture (1963), The Alan Gallery.
- Richard Hunt Sculpture (1960), The Alan Gallery.
- Richard Hunt Sculpture (1958), The Alan Gallery.

The following exhibition catalogs have been published in conjunction with group museum and gallery exhibitions of Hunt's art:

- African American art : Harlem Renaissance, civil rights era, and beyond (2012), Washington, DC: Smithsonian American Art Museum.
- Presage of Passage (1999), Brigham Young University Museum of Art.
- Richmond Barthe Richard Hunt: Two Sculptors Two Eras (1994), United States Information Agency.
- The Appropriate Object: Maren Hassinger, Richard Hunt, Oliver Jackson, Alvin Loving, Betye Saar, Raymond Saunders, John Scott (1989), Albright-Knox Art Gallery.
- Traditions and Transformations: Contemporary Afro-American Sculpture (1989), The Bronx Museum of the Arts.
- The New Sculpture Group - A Look Back: 1957-1962 (1988), New York Studio School.
- Art in Public Places (1987), Museum of African-American Art.
- Celebrating Contemporary American Black Artists (1983), Fine Arts Museum of Long Island.
- Afro-American Abstraction, PS. 1 (1980), (multiple locations).
- In Celebration: Six Black Americans (1980), New Jersey State Museum, Trenton.
- Sculpture: American Directions, 1945-1975 (1975), National Collection of Fine Arts, Smithsonian Institution.
- Four Artists (1969), Indiana University Art Museum
- 39th Arts Festival Exhibition (1968), The Art Gallery, Fisk University.
- Seven Americans (1965), The Arkansas Arts Center.

=== Richard Hunt artist monograph ===
A 352-page volume on the seven-decade career of Richard Hunt was published in 2022. It includes a foreword, three scholarly essays, an in-depth interview, and an extensive illustrated chronology of Hunt's life.

The book is a comprehensive look into Hunt's work and career. It contains over 350 images including historical photographs, installation shots, images of Hunt in his studio, newspaper clippings, and full color reproduction photographs of significant works of art. The text includes an introduction by Courtney J. Martin, essays by John Yau, Jordan Carter, and LeRonn P. Brooks, an interview by Adrienne Childs, and a chronology by Jon Ott, who is Hunt's official biographer

Oprah Daily declared it as "A lavish, trenchant retrospective of our most prominent Black sculptors."
