= We Will =

2005 sculpture in Chicago, Illinois, U.S.

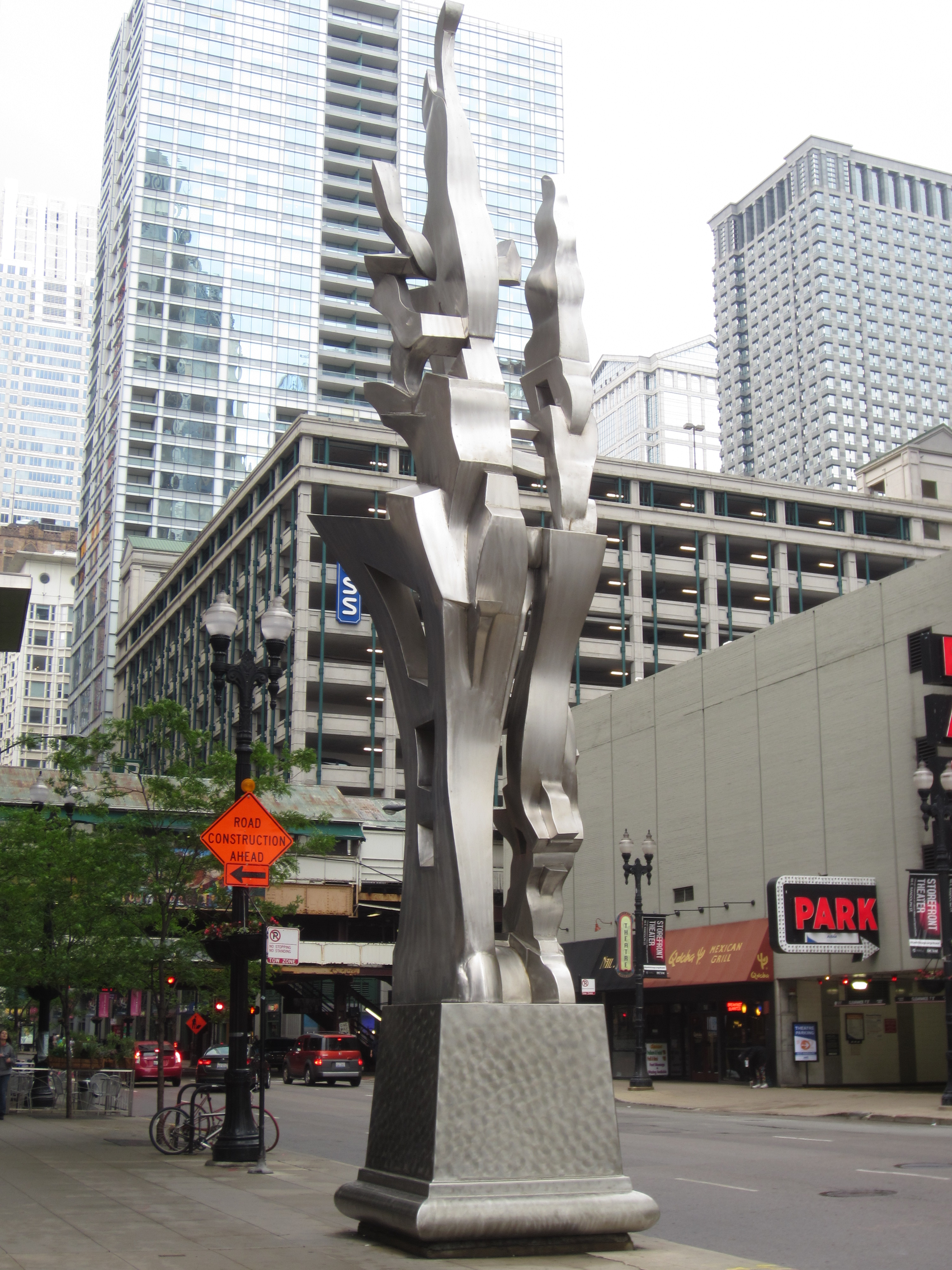
- The sculpture in 2015
- Artist: Richard Hunt
- Year: 2005
- Medium: Stainless steel sculpture
- Location: Chicago, Illinois, U.S.
- 41.884416°N 87.625473°W

We Will is an outdoor 2005 welded stainless steel sculpture by Richard Hunt, installed in Chicago, in the U.S. state of Illinois.

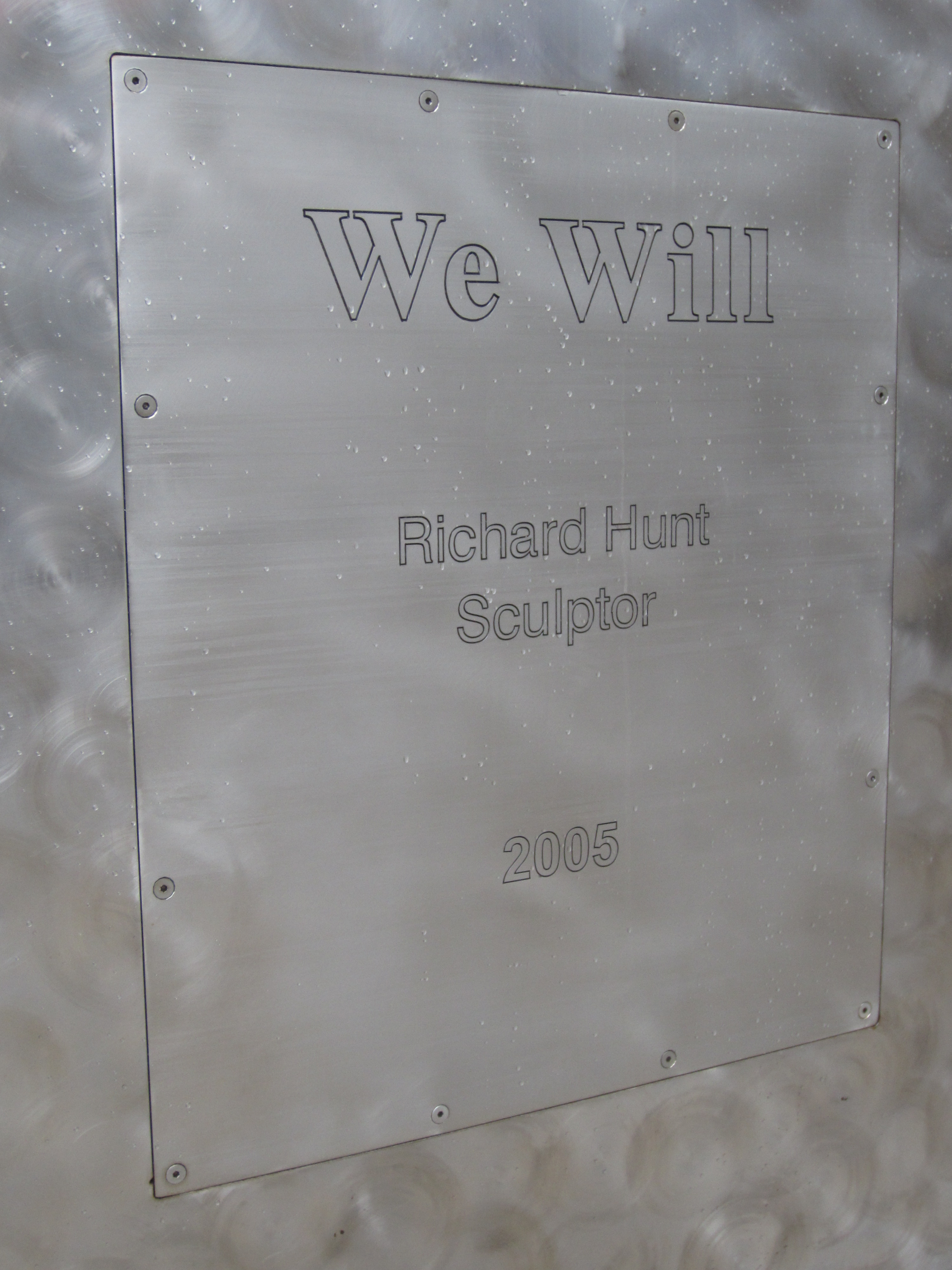
Plaque

== See also ==
- 2005 in art
- List of public art in Chicago
