= A Bridge Across and Beyond =

Public artwork by Richard Hunt

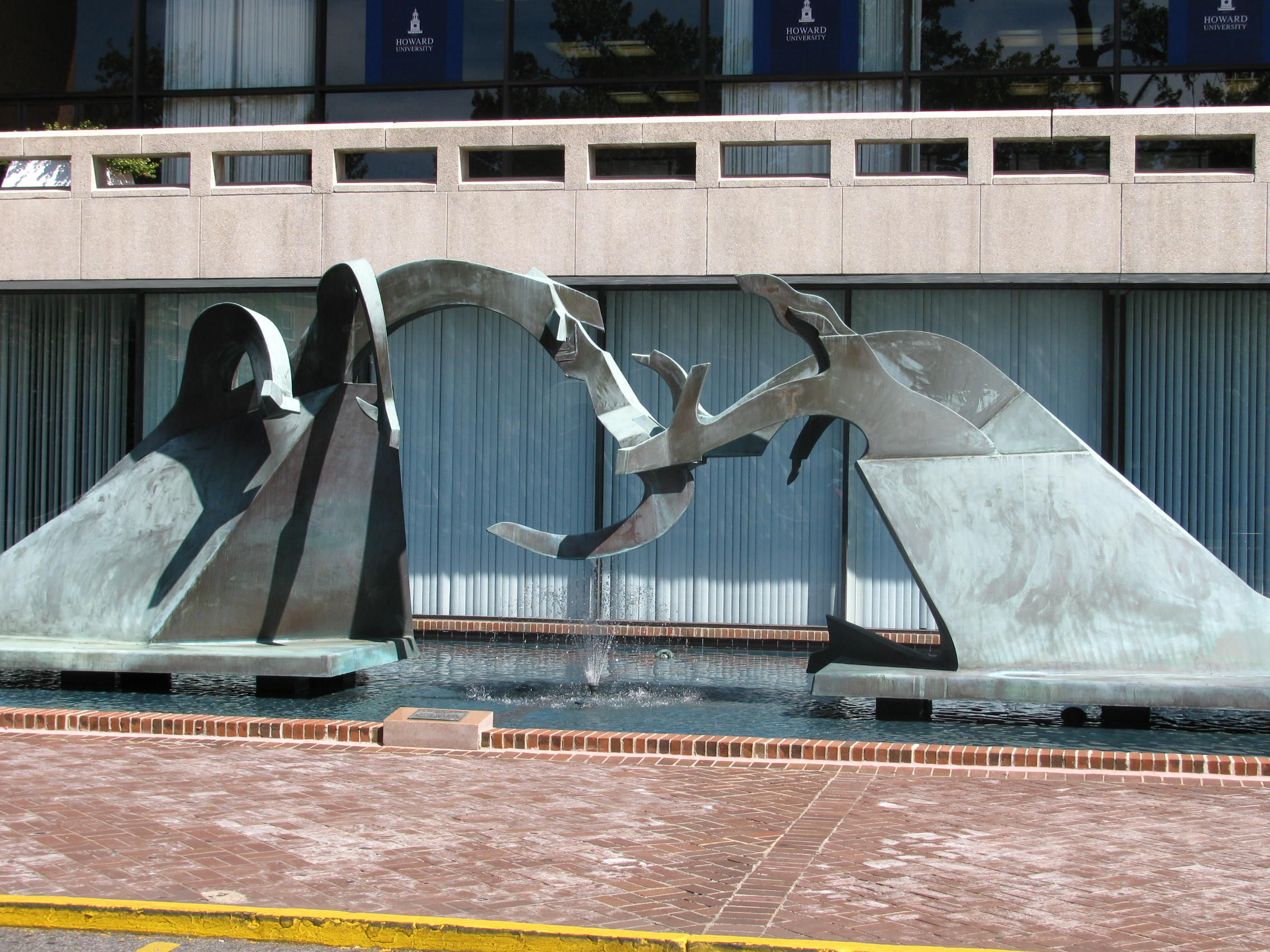
- Artist: Richard Hunt
- Year: 1978
- Type: Bronze
- Location: Washington, D.C.; 38°55′26.52″N 77°1′8.81″W
- Owner: Howard University

A Bridge Across and Beyond, is a public artwork by American artist Richard Hunt, located at the Blackburn Center on the Howard University campus in Washington, D.C., United States. A Bridge Across and Beyond was originally surveyed as part of the Smithsonian's Save Outdoor Sculpture! survey in 1993.

== Description ==
"A Bridge Across and Beyond" is a welded bronze abstract sculpture which sits, surrounded by fountains, within a large reflecting pool. The sculpture consists of two massive pyramid-like structures that bend towards each other, symbolizing both Africa and the descendants of Africans in America; the "bridge" is formed by abstract African symbols reaching across from each pyramid to the other.

== Acquisition and tribute ==
This sculpture was donated to the university by John Debrew, Jr., the CEO of Mildred Andrew's Fund. The sculpture is dedicated to Debrew's mother, Katie May Artis Debrew and all single mothers in the world.

== Condition ==
This sculpture was surveyed in 1993 for its condition and was described that "well maintained". However, since 2005, the fountain has only been filled sporadically, due to cracks in the fountain. In lieu of repairing the fountain, Howard has considered removing the fountain, leaving the sculpture "suspended over a solid plaza." In 2007, Howard's Blackburn Center director, Roberta McLeod, passed out fliers and considered raising money to fix the fountain, desiring to leave it a working fountain unlike other fountains on campus, which were no longer running. Regarding the fixing of the fountain McLeod stated "I want it back the way it used to be because it was beautiful."
