= Symbiosis (sculpture) =

Public artwork by Richard Hunt

- Bison
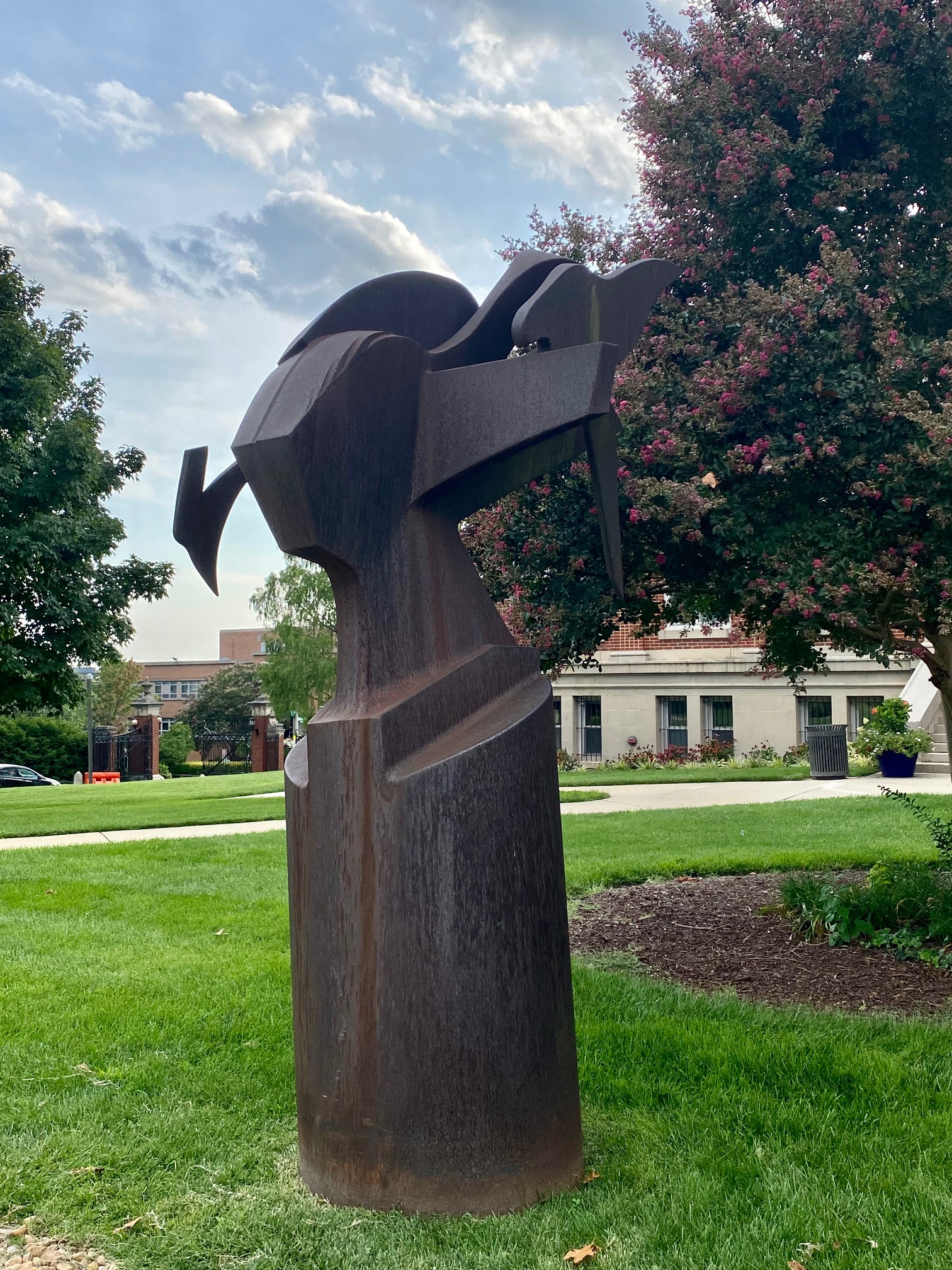
- Artist: Richard Hunt
- Year: c. 1981
- Type: Steel
- Dimensions: 274.32 cm × 121.92 cm (108.00 in × 48.00 in)
- Location: Washington, D.C.; 38.923116°N 77.020662°W
- Owner: Howard University

Symbiosis, is a public artwork by American artist Richard Hunt, located at the Carnegie Hall on the Howard University campus in Washington, D.C., United States. Symbiosis was originally surveyed as part of the Smithsonian's Save Outdoor Sculpture! survey in 1993.

== Description ==
This corten steel abstract sculpture is described as "resembling a head, either human or animal, with appendages." It has no base—the entire piece rests on the ground.

This sculpture, sometimes called Bison, was a gift to Howard University by Hobart Taylor, Jr., a former member of the Board of Trustees. Taylor died in 1981 and the sculpture was dedicated to the university on December 2, 1981.

An appraisal made by Art Resource Technical Service in 2004 valued the sculpture at $50,000 ($85,227 in 2025 dollars). The sculpture was surveyed in 1993 for its condition and it was described as "well maintained".
