= Jon Ott =

American artist

Jon Ott is an American arts administrator, art collector, and the official biographer and exhibitions advisor for African-American sculptor Richard Hunt. He is a founding board member of the Richard Hunt Legacy Foundation and chair emeritus of the International Sculpture Center. Ott became involved in supporting Hunt's artistic career and preserving his legacy after he died at the age of 88 in 2023.

== Career ==
Work with Richard Hunt

As an adolescent, Ott was introduced to Hunt by his parents. Later, he purchased a small sculpture of his. Hunt attended Ott's wedding in 2004, which came as a surprise, since they had only met a few times prior.

In 2019, Ott began interviewing Hunt to learn more about his art and life, and traveled with him on several art-focused trips, as well. Hunt wrote to Ott on March 28, 2023, stating that "I want you to know I consider you my 'official biographer.' Your research and our dialogue put you in the unique position of being more knowledgeable of my history than any other person."

Ott has conducted over one hundred hours of interviews and compiled a comprehensive chronology of Hunt's life and work, which was published in the 2022 monograph, Richard Hunt (Gregory Miller & Co).

Ott has given gallery talks and participated in panel discussions about Hunt's work at major national arts institutions including the Chicago History Museum (Chicago, IL), the Amon Carter Museum of American Art (Fort Worth, TX), the Abraham Lincoln Presidential Library and Museum (Springfield, IL), and White Cube Bermondsey (London, UK). Ott has been a recurring guest on National Public Radio, where he's been interviewed about Richard Hunt's life and career, and his 2024 exhibition titled Freedom in Form, at the Abraham Lincoln Presidential Museum.

In a quote published in The New York Times, Ott indicates Hunt's drive for social justice and liberation, stating that, "That really set the tone for his entire artistic life, which was really focused around representing freedom, and freedom in every sense."

Ott is featured in the documentary film, The Light of Truth: Richard Hunt's Monument to Ida B. Wells,. 2024. The film, directed by Rana Segal, documents Hunt's artistic process, and the integration of public art and social justice activism within his monumental sculptures. In 2023, the Richard Hunt Legacy Foundation was established as a nonprofit arts organization. Ott is a founding board member and vice chair of the foundation.

When the Public Art Archive published a database to document Richard Hunt's public works of art, Ott served as a content curator and collaborator for the project.

International Sculpture Center

In 2020, Ott was appointed as the International Sculpture Center's Chairman of the Board of Trustees to serve a three-year term. Richard Hunt was the recipient of the Lifetime Achievement Award from the International Sculpture Center in 2009.

== Bibliography ==
Ott's writing on the artwork of Richard Hunt has been published in several short and long form articles and essays. In 2022, the monograph Richard Hunt was published with contributions from Ott as well as arts critics and historians LeRonn P. Brooks, Jordan Carter, Adrienne Childs, and John Yau. For the publication, Ott organized a comprehensive illustrated chronology of Hunt's life and artistic career. Ott's 2024 essay, "Richard Hunt: Sculpting Freedom," was published in conjunction with the exhibition Richard Hunt: Freedom in Form at the Abraham Lincoln Presidential Library and Museum.
