= Build-Grow =

Sculpture by Richard Hunt

Build-Grow is a sculpture by Richard Hunt, made in 1986 at York College, City University of New York and located in Jamaica, Queens, New York.

Build-Grow is a welded stainless steel 156” high semi-abstract sculpture created in 1986, resembling a Tree of Life. It is located before the North entrance to York College at Archer Avenue. The sculpture is located in an outdoor environment, surrounded by trees and man-made structures in the entrance to the school.

== Build-Grow (1992) ==
Richard Hunt created another Build-Grow sculpture in 1992 in Connolly Plaza, Metro Center in Washington, D.C. The sculpture is composed of welded bronze with the dimensions of 22’ H x 7’ W x 7’ D. Hunt wanted to explore the idea of nature, brought to life with man made materials. The sculptures from 1986 and 1992 are similar in composition and features. The sculpture Hunt made in Washington is made of a different medium, and has a rigid frame surrounding the piece. The sculpture resembles nature, breaking out from within the confines of the frame, the two large, branch like figures sprouting from the borders of the sculpture, like roots sprouting from the ground through fractures in concrete. The sculpture in York college is different as it is not contained within a frame, however both sculptures mimic a tree with its branches springing upward and outward.
