= Marion Boulton Stroud =

American curator (1939–2015)

- Boulton Stroud in January 2014
- Born: Marion Boulton Stroud; March 22, 1939; Philadelphia, Pennsylvania, U.S.
- Died: August 22, 2015 (aged 76); Northeast Harbor, Maine, U.S.
- Other names: Marion Stroud Swingle, Kippy Stroud
- Education: Chatham Hall, University of Pennsylvania
- Title: Founder, Director, The Fabric Workshop and Museum
- Spouse: Clinton Swingle
- Parent(s): Marion Sims Rosengarten, Morris W. Stroud

Marion Boulton Stroud, also known as Marion Stroud Swingle (March 22, 1939 – August 22, 2015) was an American curator, author, and museum director who was particularly active in her support of contemporary art, and of the use of textiles as a medium. She was the founder and director of The Fabric Workshop and Museum in Philadelphia, Pennsylvania, and a trustee and active supporter of the Philadelphia Museum of Art. She is commonly referred to as "Kippy".

== Personal life ==
Marion Boulton Stroud was born on March 22, 1939, the only child of Dr. Morris Wistar Stroud 3d (1913–1990), a pioneer in geriatric medicine, and his first wife, Marion Sims Rosengarten (1913–1988). Boulton Stroud married Clinton Darlington Swingle (1928–2013) on February 20, 1980, in Nacogdoches County, Texas.

== Career ==
Boulton Stroud graduated from the University of Pennsylvania with a master's degree in art history. After graduating, she took her first job at the Philadelphia Museum of Art as director of art sales and rentals. She roomed with Anne d'Harnoncourt, the institution's future director.

Boulton Stroud was artistic director of a community organization, Prints in Progress, teaching silk-screening to inner-city kids from 1971 to 1977. She also founded an international artistic think tank, the Acadia Summer Arts Program (or "Kamp Kippy") on Mount Desert Island, Maine.

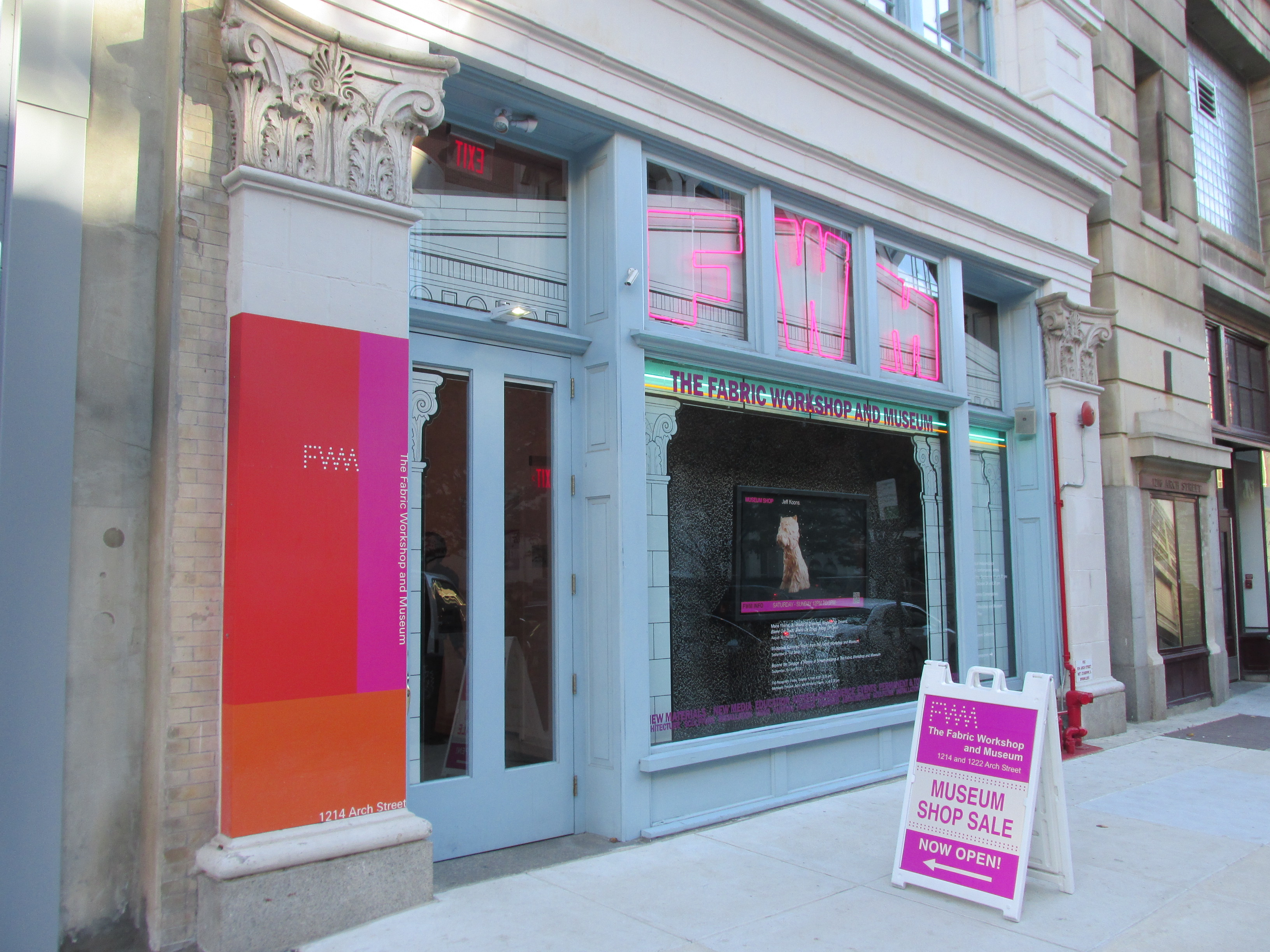
The Fabric Workshop and Museum in Philadelphia

In 1977, Boulton Stroud started The Fabric Workshop in Philadelphia, Pennsylvania, as a studio where artists could explore unfamiliar media, particularly fabric arts. Her goal was "to explore, to take liberties, to be a studio and laboratory of new design, unhampered by rules and precedents". Artists were invited to attend "without any preconceived notions of what they had to do". In 1978, with the help of curator (and cousin) Patterson Sims, Boulton Stroud hosted 22 artists in two-week residencies.

Over time, the length of residencies was extended from two weeks to two years. Those invited included architects, sculptors, painters, and craftspeople. Hundreds of artists have done residencies, including Robert Venturi, Denise Scott Brown, Steven Izenour, Italo Scanga, Cai Guo-Qiang, Red Grooms, Louise Bourgeois, Donald Lipski, Claes Oldenburg, Marina Abramović, Lorna Simpson, and Bill Viola.

The workshop moved from its original 5,000 square foot space at 1133 Arch Street to a 35,000 foot rental at 1315 Cherry Street, and finally to a multi-floor space at 1214 Arch Street. The collection of materials and finished pieces also grew, and in 1996 the workshop was expanded to become The Fabric Workshop and Museum.

Boulton Stroud curated exhibitions, lectured nationally, and wrote and edited publications for the Fabric Workshop and Museum. New Material as New Media: The Fabric Workshop and Museum (2002) won the Frances Smyth-Ravenel Prize for Excellence in Publication Design, from the American Association of Museums in 2003. Cai Guo-Qiang: Fallen Blossoms (2010) won the award for Best Project in a Public Space from the International Association of Art Critics.

Cai Guo-Qiang's two-venue exhibition at the Fabric Workshop and Museum and the Philadelphia Museum of Art commemorated the friendship between Boulton Stroud and Anne d'Harnoncourt. The two women had invited Guo-Qiang to come to Philadelphia, but d'Harnoncourt died before he could do so. Boulton Stroud's recorded memories of d'Harnoncourt were the inspiration for the creation of a set of woven tapestries, Time Flies Like a Weaving Shuttle; the destruction by fireworks and water of a written Time Scroll; and a public fireworks display.

Boulton Stroud was a trustee at the Philadelphia Museum of Art where she served on a number of committees including the 20th Century Art Committee and the African American Art Committee, and chaired the Prints, Drawings, and Photographs Committee. She also worked with the National Endowment of the Arts and the Pennsylvania Council on the Arts. She was a founding member of the National Committee of the Whitney Museum of American Art.

"She was of enormous importance for us in contemporary art... She was a donor of many fine works and, from time to time, of funds to acquire things we did not have the resources to acquire ourselves. Over the last 20 to 30 years, she had a really significant impact." Timothy Rub, director, Philadelphia Museum of Art

== Awards ==
Boulton Stroud was elected to the American Craft Council as an Honorary Fellow in 1988. She was declared one of the "Distinguished Daughters of Pennsylvania" by Governor Ed Rendell in 2006, and received Maine's Skowhegan Governor's Award, given for "outstanding service to art and artists".

Stroud was also a prolific competitor in field trials for dogs. Her black lab 'Robber's Stray Bullet' placed first in the U.S. National Open Retriever Championship in 2014.

== Death ==
Boulton Stroud died on August 22, 2015, in Northeast Harbor, Maine. In 2016, a substantial part of Boulton Stroud's art collection (including four pieces by Georgia O'Keeffe) was offered for sale with proceeds going to the Marion Boulton "Kippy" Stroud Foundation, for the ongoing support of The Fabric Workshop and Museum. Boulton Stroud's collection contained around 1,500 works of art, including pieces by Georgia O'Keeffe, Henrietta Shore, Marsden Hartley, George Bellows, Arthur Dove, Joseph Stella, and Andy Warhol.
