= The Fabric Workshop and Museum =

Non-profit organization in Pennsylvania, US

Coordinates: 39.9539°N 75.1602°W

Fabric Workshop and Museum
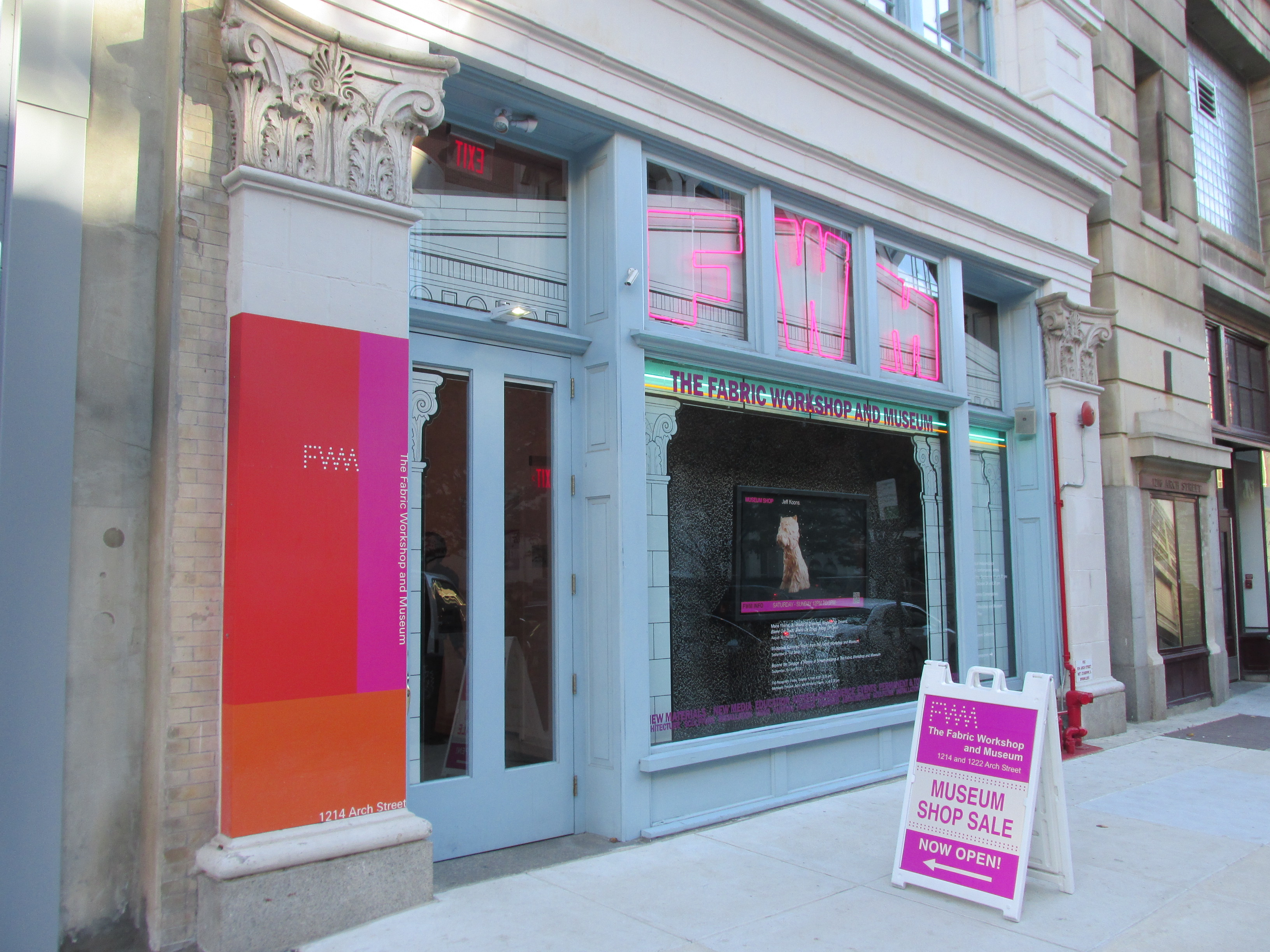
- The Fabric Workshop and Museum
- Established: 1977
- Location: 1214 Arch Street, Philadelphia, Pennsylvania, U.S.
- Public transit access: SEPTA bus: 23, 45, 48
- Website: www.fabricworkshopandmuseum.org

The Fabric Workshop and Museum, located in Philadelphia, Pennsylvania, is a non-profit arts organization devoted to creating new work in new materials and new media in collaboration with emerging, nationally, and internationally recognized artists.

Founded in 1977, the Fabric Workshop and Museum has an Artist-in-Residence Program, an extensive permanent collection of new work created by artists in collaboration with the Workshop, in-house and touring exhibitions, and comprehensive educational programming including lectures, tours, in-school presentations, and student apprenticeships.

== History ==
The Fabric Workshop and Museum was founded in 1977 by Marion Boulton Stroud. Stroud's goal was to create a non-profit workshop that combined team-work and innovation. The Artists in Residency program provided space, tools and assistance for the artists to make functional objects through screen printing on fabric.

When FWM saw that artists ideas, especially the installation based, were being stifled in the process of translating their ideas into a functional objects, they dropped that principle and allowed the work to be non-functional as well. The rules bent more and more as years went on, allowing artists to expand on the word "fabric". The team of FWM staff and artists have now created work using everything from wire mesh, horse hair and fiberglass. They have exhibited outside of their own space, from Eastern State Penitentiary to New York, Venice, London, Dakar and Los Angeles. The FWM strives to push artists in new directions, opening their eyes to see anything they think up can be done. The FWM has said, "we can do anything, and we have the talent, knowledge and resources to accomplish what we set out to do."

In 1996, when the collection of documentation and work created by Artists in Residence grew, it became apparent that this work was historically important and needed to be displayed to the public as well as cared for. The Fabric Workshop became "The Fabric Workshop and Museum", and now has a permanent collection of over 5,500 objects created by more than 400 artists.

Due to the expansion of their neighbor, the Philadelphia Convention Center, the Fabric Workshop and Museum has changed its location three times. Its current location is 1214 Arch Street.

== Workshop ==
The Fabric Workshop and Museum's Artist in Residency program consists of nationally and internationally known contemporary artists. The artists, who may be emerging or established, experiment and explore varies materials and techniques. The Artistic Director invites artists to participate in the Artist in Residence Program after consulting with the Fabric Workshop and Museum Artist Advisory Committee. The committee meets 1–2 times a year to select candidates for residency.

This program brings together conceptual painters, sculptors, architects, and designers, and also includes installation art, performance and video. FWM supplies all the funding and materials to the artists. Artists work with an FWM staff of printers and technicians. If a project requires additional staff, FWM may hire desired professionals. Artists may also bring their own assistants for their projects. Artists are exposed to new techniques, materials and recourses not accessible to them previously. This creative collaboration opens possibilities for the artist's own work as well as introduces innovations to expand the limits of contemporary art. In the previous location of FWM it was possible to visit the facilities where the artists work. The new location does not continue this tradition, but there is an option to schedule a special tour.

== Museum ==
The Fabric Workshop and Museums permanent collection contains work by artists such as Louise Bourgeois, Sonya Clark, Félix González-Torres, Ann Hamilton, Reverend Howard Finster, Anish Kapoor, Robert Kushner, Glenn Ligon, Robert Morris, Robert Venturi and Denise Scott Brown, and Carrie Mae Weems. The collection includes completed works as well as preliminary sketches and other objects documenting the artists' progress throughout their stay. The Fabric Workshop and Museum has an additional gallery space that exhibits work done by the most recent artist in residence. This space may also be used to display work by artists outside of the residency program, so long as it shares in FWM's passion for new, fresh contemporary work.

== Education ==
The Fabric Workshop and Museum offers art education to all ages from kindergarten to post-graduates. Even educators can benefit from the services offered by the FWM. Through the apprentice training program and the study tours and various other educational programs offered by the organization, the public is given the opportunity to learn and benefit from the organization.

=== Apprentice Training Program ===
Apprentice training is offered to high school students as well as college students and post-graduates. The high school program allows local students to gain knowledge and career-based training that schools cannot while the students earn minimum wage for their efforts. The College and Post-Graduate Apprentice Training Program accepts both local and international students to participate in the workings of the FWM itself and also to learn the trade of screen-printing itself.

=== Other educational programs ===
- Study Tours cost $5.00 per person and allow admittance into the museum as well as a behind-the-scenes look at the workshop itself.
- The Onsite Studio Program is a once weekly program for grade school classes. An employee of the FWM will instruct students in creating a silkscreen fabric.
- The Online Curriculum offered by the Fabric Workshop and Museum "utilizes the museum's collection as a vehicle for exploring interdisciplinary ideas and concepts. Designed for K-12 use, these lessons offer an array of interdisciplinary suggestions that will enliven and enrich your curriculum."
- Evenings for Educators gives the opportunity for teachers to learn silkscreen printing techniques and see the facility as well as "explore how contemporary art, and FWM programs in particular, can enliven classroom discussions and activities."
- The Family Program allows children and their parents to experience contemporary art and the media itself while they also have the opportunity to tour the exhibits and studios.
