= Allan L. Edmunds =

American artist

Allan Logan Edmunds
- Born: 1949; Philadelphia, Pennsylvania
- Known for: Painter, educator, arts manager

Allan L. Edmunds (born 1949, Philadelphia, Pennsylvania) is an American artist.

== Biography ==
Edmunds attended the Tyler School of Art and Architecture, receiving a master's degree in Fine Art. In 1972 Edmunds founded the Brandywine Graphic Workshop (now the Brandywine Workshop and Archives (BWA)) in Philadelphia.

His work is included in the collections of the National Gallery of Art, the Philadelphia Museum of Art, the Smithsonian American Art Museum, and the Woodmere Art Museum.

Edmunds' work was included in the 2015 exhibition We Speak: Black Artists in Philadelphia, 1920s-1970s at the Woodmere Art Museum.
