= Brandywine Workshop and Archives =

- Formation: 1972
- Founder: Allan L. Edmunds
- Location: Philadelphia, Pennsylvania
- Website: brandywineworkshopandarchives.org

The Brandywine Workshop and Archives (BWA) is a nonprofit organization in Philadelphia, Pennsylvania created to produce limited-edition screen-printed fine art.

== History ==
BWA was founded by Allan L. Edmunds in 1972 as the Brandywine Graphic Workshop. Originally located in the predominantly Black and Hispanic area of North Philadelphia, the workshop registered as a 501(c)(3) tax-exempt cultural institution in 1974.

The workshop moved to 1520 Kater Street in South Philadelphia then to 730 South Broad Street.

The BWA provided educational programs as well as residencies for artists from around the United States. Prints from the BWA are in the collections of the Philadelphia Museum of Art, the Pennsylvania Academy of the Fine Arts, and the Harvard Art Museums.

In 2012 the Philadelphia Museum of Art exhibited the retrospective Full Spectrum: Prints from the Brandywine Workshop. In 2022 the Harvard Art Museums exhibited the retrospective Prints from the Brandywine Workshop and Archives: Creative Communities.
