= Raymond Steth =

American painter (1917–1997)

- Born: Raymond Edgar Ryles; 1917; Norfolk, Virginia, United States
- Died: February 6, 1997 (aged 79–80); Philadelphia, Pennsylvania, United States
- Known for: Painting, lithograph
- Notable work: Refinery (1941); Beacons of Defense (1941); Evolution of Swing (1939); Heaven on a Mule (ca. 1938-43)

Raymond Steth (1917 - 1997), born Raymond Ryles, was a Philadelphia-based graphic artist recognized for his paintings and lithographs on the African-American condition in the mid-20th century, often through scenes of rural life and poverty. Working under the Works Progress Administration's graphics division in the 1930s and 1940s, Steth's art covered a range of topics and emotions from pleasurable farm life to protest and despair.

== Early life ==
Steth was born in Norfolk, Virginia in 1917 to Lulu Mann and Charles Ryles, a working-class farming family. He spent much of his childhood on a large farm in North Carolina, which would later influence his artwork. Rolando Corpus notes: "Steth had a religious upbringing within the Pentecostal faith. 'The frenetic atmosphere of the church,' he recalled, 'was such that they all seemed ready to go to heaven.'" After moving to Philadelphia at age eight, Steth attended Central High School for two years. He subsequently worked in sign painting and vaudeville theater. Steth was educated at the Philadelphia College of Art from 1941 until 1943, and the Barnes Foundation from 1942 to 1944.

== Career ==
Steth was associated with the American Scene movement, which included WPA artists concerned with contemporary social topics. Steth began working in the graphics division of the WPA-sponsored Federal Art Project (FAP) in Philadelphia starting in 1938, where he met and collaborated with Dox Thrash, known for developing new methods of Carborundum printmaking, who believed Steth's work could be transferred to a print medium. He also worked alongside Michael J. Gallagher, John Turner, and Claude Clark, a group with whom he would often exhibit his work with. Steth shared a studio with Clark during their time in the WPA/FAP. He also associated with the artists, Hubert Mesibov and Samuel Brown.

Post-WPA and military service, Steth continued his involvement with the arts and community causes: "Steth directed the Philographic School of Art, a printmaking and graphics workshop... Other jobs included helping establish a print program at Morgan State College in Baltimore, catering, and working for the Mayor's Office of Community Development." Additionally, he was involved with the Fleisher Art Memorial from 1948 until 1954, and taught at the Philadelphia College of Art from 1949 until 1951. He was later a resident at the Pennsylvania Academy of the Fine Arts.

Steth died of cancer on 6 February 1997.

Steth's work is in the collection of the Metropolitan Museum of Art, the Philadelphia Museum of Art, the National Gallery of Art, and the Pennsylvania Academy of the Fine Arts.

His work was included in the 2015 exhibition We Speak: Black Artists in Philadelphia, 1920s-1970s at the Woodmere Art Museum.
