= Reba Dickerson-Hill =

American sumi-e and watercolor artist

- Born: 1918; Philadelphia, PA
- Died: 1994 (aged 75–76); Philadelphia, PA
- Education: Cheyney University
- Website: https://rebadickersonhill.com/

Reba Dickerson-Hill was a self-taught Philadelphia artist who painted in the ancient Japanese ink-and- brush technique called sumi-e. She was also a watercolorist and oil painter who primarily produced landscapes and portraits.

== Early life and education ==
Dickerson-Hill was born in West Philadelphia on February 18, 1918, to Evan Thomas Dickerson and Reba Henrietta Tyree Dickerson. One of six children, she started drawing when she was about 4 years old. Her father and an elementary school principal recognized her talent. As a youth, she spent some time sketching along Benjamin Franklin Parkway near the Philadelphia Museum of Art.

She attended Overbook High School and enrolled at Cheyney State Teachers College. She graduated in 1940 with a Bachelor of Science degree in education. A 1940 article in the Baltimore Afro American newspaper about Cheyney's graduates noted that she was an artist and planned to make it her career. She taught elementary grades in the Philadelphia School District starting around 1949. During the 1960s, she was an assistant professor of fine arts at Cheyney. She gave up teaching around 1966 to become a full-time artist.

== Her career as painter ==
Dickerson-Hill worked in several mediums: watercolor, oil, collage, mixed media, pen and ink, ink and brush, sumi-e, sculpture, calligraphy and acrylics. She also produced prints.

She was a self-taught artist, with no formal art-school degree. In Philadelphia, she learned painting techniques from Claude Clark (in the mid-1940s) and Paul Keene; printing from printmaker/painter/illustrator Jerome Kaplan; calligraphy from Marvin Bileck, and kinesthetic Chinese watercolor techniques from Ramon Fina, known for his expertise in the ancient tradition of Chinese brush painting.

She first learned about Eastern art techniques from Fina when she studied at the Barnes Foundation around 1947. In 1959, she attended a presentation by Fina at the Plastic Club, a women’s art organization, in Philadelphia.

Dickerson-Hill studied at Temple University, the University of Pennsylvania, the University of the Arts/Philadelphia College of the Arts, Pendle Hill in Wallingford, PA, and the University of Exeter, England. In 1950, she was a member of Les Beau Arts, a group of African Americans in the arts, music and literature. Artist Benjamin Britt was also a member.

In 1946, Dickerson-Hill was in a show to support young Black artists sponsored by the Henry O. Tanner Memorial Fund. The exhibit was held at the Wharton Centre, a social service agency in North Philadelphia that hosted a youth arts program and exhibits. The artworks were donated to various community organizations. Her painting “Still Life” went to St. Christopher's Hospital for Children and “Study No. 2” to the Crime Prevention Association.

She participated in a series of exhibitions at Cheyney in 1956 as an alumna and in 1966 as a faculty member. The 1966 exhibit was the college's first Fine Arts Festival, and she was one of three faculty members represented. Among her entries were watercolors, according to an unidentified newspaper article that appeared to be a campus publication. The watercolors were “The Boatman,” “The Bay” and “What is Man.” Two of her oil paintings were also shown, “Metropolis” and “Nisi Dominus Frustra,” as well as a portrait of William P. Young, who was Pennsylvania's second Black cabinet member as secretary of Labor and Industry.

Dickerson-Hill's oil painting “Study in Copper and Bronze” won first prize by popular vote in a 1969 art exhibit at the branch office of Liberty Federal Savings and Loan Association in the Germantown section of Philadelphia. She had exhibited at the bank before, in 1960, in a solo show of 45 paintings and drawings.

She was also represented in three major exhibits of Black artists in 1969 and 1971. She was one of 100 artists from around the country in an exhibit sponsored by the Philadelphia School District and the Museum of the Philadelphia Civic Center in 1969. In 1971, she was featured in an Aesthetic Dynamics' exhibit organized by artist Percy Ricks in Wilmington, DE, which drew 75 artists from New York to Washington, DC. Also in 1971, she participated in the National Exhibition of Black Artists at the Smith-Mason Gallery in Washington, DC.

In 1960, she also was featured at the Pyramid Club, a social organization of Black professional men that held an annual art exhibit starting in 1941. Others on hand were Howard N. Watson, Benjamin Britt, Robert Jefferson, Samuel J. Brown Jr. and Dox Thrash.

She was a member of the Philadelphia Watercolor Club (where she was board member and life member) and the Philadelphia Print Club.

Among her exhibitions: the Philadelphia Art Teachers Association, Woodmere Art Museum, the Philadelphia Urban League Guild, October Gallery, Allens Lane Art Center and the University of the Arts. Her foreign exhibits were in South America, Europe and the Bahamas. Sidney Rothman's The Gallery in Barnegat Light, NJ, exhibited and sold her works.

She received a National Design Award and in 1980, the Andrew Wyeth watercolor prize. She served as a judge at several art exhibitions, conducted workshops on sumi-e and served on several exhibition-planning committees.

== Mastering the Japanese art of sumi-e ==
Dickerson-Hill learned sumi-e painting from Fina while at the Barnes. Her sumi-e painting “The Philosopher” was the cover image of the Sumi-e Society of America's quarterly in 1984.

She did not go to Japan until 1986, where she spent 19 days in Tokyo, Kyoto and Nara. A year later, she arrived in Exeter, England, for a sumi-e workshop conducted by the foremost master of Zen arts Shozo Sato.

Sumi-e originated in ancient China and made its way to Japan. The process is very focused and precise, with its own ritual, she explained to a newspaper writer. It required clearing of the mind, using the traditional tools (special ink, bowl, animal-hair brush and rice paper ) and adhering to the process, including no altering of lines on paper after they have been painted. On some of her sumi-e paintings, Dickerson-Hill stamped her name in Japanese. She had the stamps specially made: One is her name and the other means "woman who loves art and beauty," she told a Philadelphia Tribune newspaper writer during an October Gallery Art Expo in 1988. She often attended the annual art expos held by the gallery.

In 1992, the Sumi-e Society of America honored her for the painting “Into the Light,” awarded during its 27th annual competition and exhibition in Mobile, AL. Some years before, she had won the society's purchase award for the painting “The Mountain.” She was a member of the society.

She is listed in the Japanese encyclopedia of sumi-e artists and Who's Who in the East, 1992-1993 edition.

== Her death and posthumous exhibits ==
Dickerson-Hill died on Jan. 17, 1994. In 1996, the Esther M. Klein Gallery at the University City Science Center in Philadelphia held a “homecoming” show in memory of Dickerson-Hill and Ellen Powell Tiberino (who had died in 1992), both described as internationally known female artists. The exhibit included ceramic-tile artwork of African people and North American flora that Dickerson-Hill had finished shortly before she died.

In 2001, Cheyney University mounted an exhibit of 100 of her paintings in an exhibit titled “Landscapes of the Heart.” In 2015, the Woodmere Art Museum included her work in a group show titled “We Speak: Black Artists in Philadelphia, 1920s-1970s.” In 2021, the Delaware Art Museum featured her work in a re-creation of Percy Ricks’ 1971 Aesthetic Dynamics show.

== Selected collections ==
According to the Reba Dickerson-Hill website, her works are in the following collections, among others: First Pennsylvania Bank, Philadelphia; Atlanta University; Cheyney University; American Frame Corp.; Philadelphia International Airport and private individuals. The Free Library of Philadelphia has two of her prints, including "The Philosopher."

== Selected exhibitions ==
- Philadelphia Urban League Guild, 1960
- Philadelphia Art Teachers Association, 1960
- Crossroads Gallery, National Bank of Chester County, 1966
- Southwest-Belmont YWCA, Philadelphia, 1967
- YWCA of Germantown, 1969
- Smith-Mason Gallery, 1971
- Continental Bank, Chestnut Hill-Philadelphia, 1981
- DeShong Museum, Widener University, 1981
- Black, Hispanic, Native American Arts Festival, Pittsburgh, 1981
- Cheyney University, 1982, 2001
- Bell Atlantic Building, Philadelphia, 1984
- Salmagundi Club, New York, 1984
- Allens Lane Art Center, 1984
- Peirce Junior College, 1986
- Temple University, 1986
- October Gallery, 1986, 1987
- Crockett Atelier art space, 1988
- Gloucester County College, 1990
- University of the Arts, 1991
- De Virgilis Designs, 1992
- Free Library of Philadelphia, 1992
- The Gallery, Sidney Rothman, 1992
