= Kliclo =

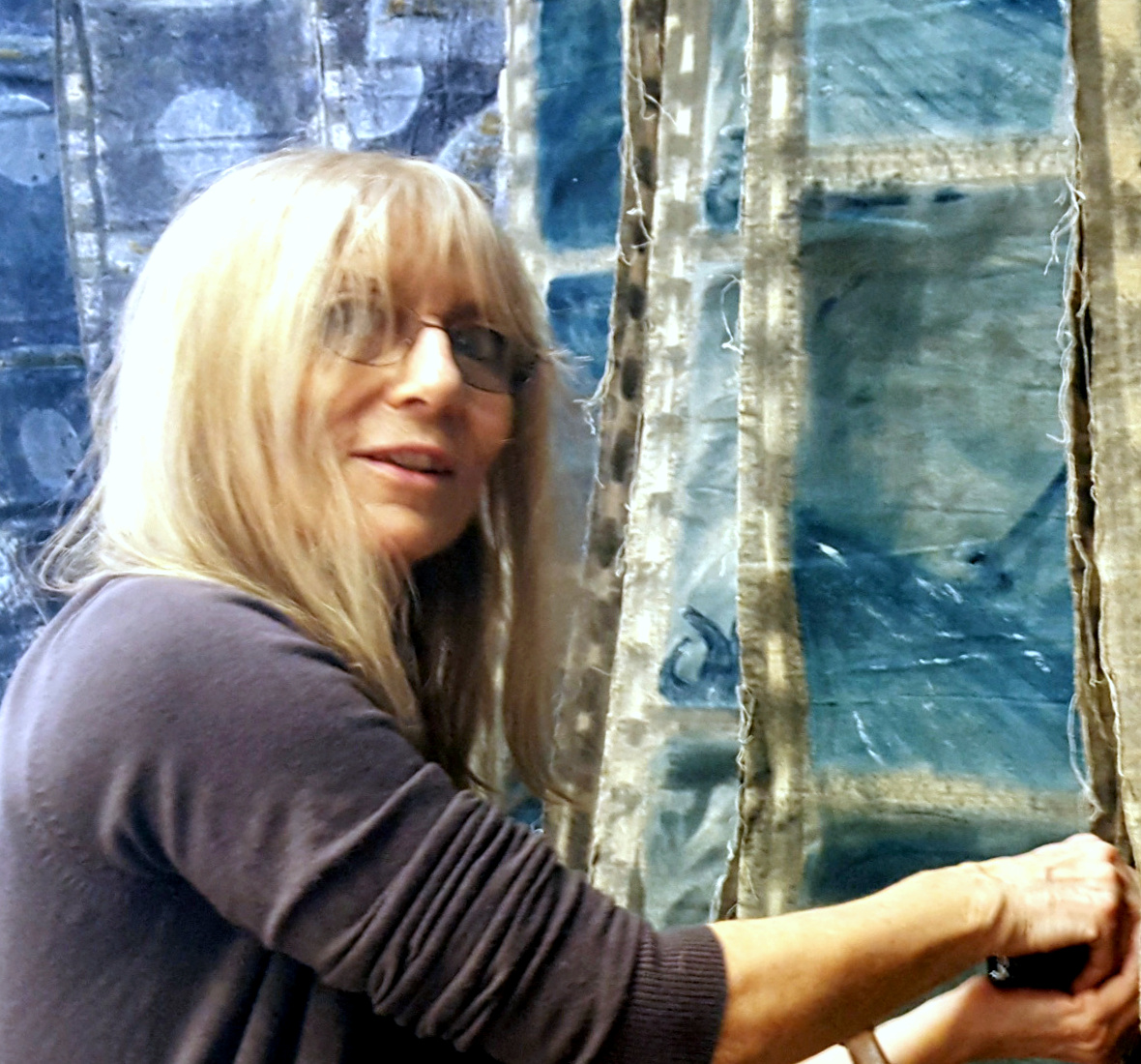
- Kliclo in 2016
- Occupation: Artist
- Known for: Installation, intaglio printmaking, painting

Kliclo is an artist based in Paris, France. Her works deal with traces, remains and memories, often using Yiddish.

== Biography ==
Kliclo studied art history and engraving with Henri Goetz and Max Papart, among others. Her works have been exhibited in Norway, Belgium, Switzerland, Germany, Israel and extensively in France, especially in Paris. Kliclo is known for her work in installation art, painting and etching. Her leitmotifs include Films, Pavements and Walls, non functioning Clocks and burnt or disintegrated Letters (message) and books. Some of her works incorporate text in Yiddish.

== Selected solo exhibitions ==
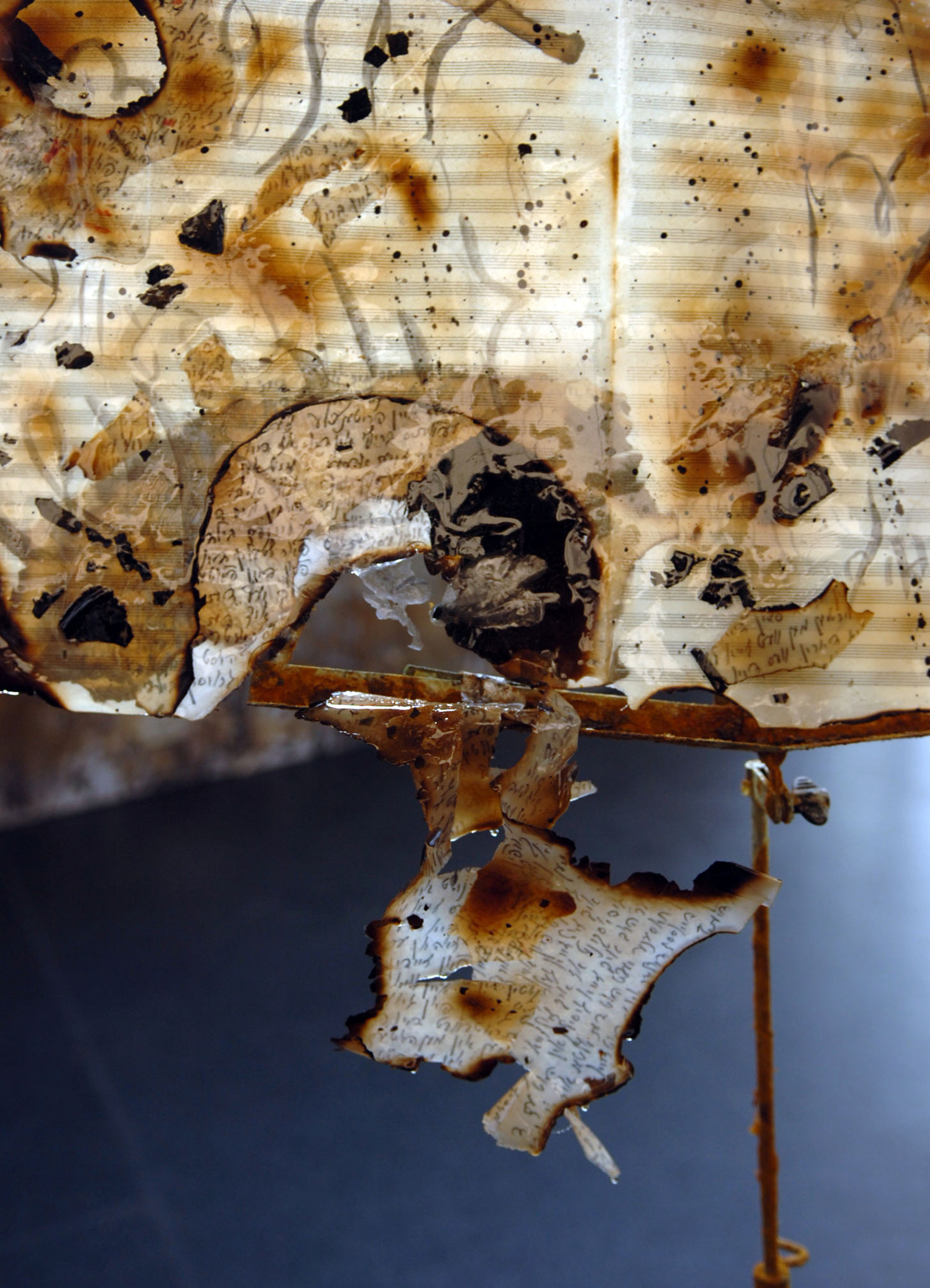
The installation "Les partitions de vent" (detail), 2013. Burned sheet music, drawing, resin, found object (music stand)

- 2018 : De 18 à 18... La roue tourne - Mairie du 13^{ème} arrondissement de Paris
- 2017 : Balades en roues libres, Espace Saint-Jean, Melun
- 2017 : Galerie Marie-Laure de l'Ecotais - Paris 6^{ème}
- 2012 : Mon Atlantide, Salle Lucie Aubrac, de Montmorency, Val-d'Oise
- 2010 : L'Apostrophe Scène nationale, Cergy-Pontoise et Val-d'Oise
- 2008 : Galerie am Storchenturm - Berlin
- 2003 : Cercle Bernard Lazare Paris, Centre culturel
- 2002 : Centre Culturel Rachi Paris - Rétrospective

== Selected group exhibitions ==
- 2016 : La Biennale d'art contemporain de Cachan 2016
- 2006 : Koï Nobori Centre Culturel Japonais Paris XIème
- 1996 : X artistes du Xème, Mairie du 10^{ème} arrondissement de Paris
- 1992 : Seville Expo '92, Sevilla, Pavillon de France

== Selected installations ==
- 2016 : Cinémathèque de Tel-Aviv - Installation Films
- 2015 : L'écume des pages - Paris 6ème - Installation Films
- 2013 : Les Partitions de vent, Espace "9Cube", la mairie du 9^{ème} arrondissement de Paris
- 2008 & 2013 : Colloques Actuel de la Shoah, École normale supérieure, Paris
- 2006 : Institut universitaire de formation des maîtres (IUFM), Paris
- 1995 : Festival du film de Genève - Performance : réalisation et installation d’un "film" sur toile

== Collections ==
- Bibliothèque nationale de France
- Yad Vashem
- Editions Filipacchi, Paris
- L'Apostrophe Public Theater, Cergy-Pontoise

== Awards ==
- 2004 – Laureate of the Prix Les Voies de la Réussite
