= Michael J. Gallagher (artist) =

American painter

Michael J. Gallagher (American Artist) born Scranton, PA 1898-died Philadelphia, PA 1965.

Gallagher was born into a mining family in Scranton, PA where he lived until he joined the U.S. Army in World War I. In 1919, Gallagher was diagnosed with tuberculosis and returned home to be treated. A doctor noticed Gallagher’s immense artistic talent and suggested that he apply for scholarships to attend the Philadelphia Museum and School of Industrial Art. Gallagher followed this advice and began his formal art training. After graduating, Gallagher made his living as a magazine illustrator.

During the Great Depression, President Roosevelt and congress passed multiple work relief programs, Roosevelt commenced a $5 billion program called Works Progress Administration (WPA), which sought to employee Americans in various fields including artists under the Federal Arts Project(FAP) In 1935, Gallagher was hired as technical director of the Philadelphia Printmaking branch of the WPA art project. Along with other WPA artists Dox Thrash and Hugh Mesibov, helped to pioneer a new technique of print making, the carborundum printmaking or carbograph.

Gallagher is known for his paintings, lithographs, woodcuts and book illustrations. He was accomplished at both figure studies and landscapes. Work by Gallagher are in the permanent collections the Smithsonian Institution, Washington, DC, the Metropolitan Museum of Art, NY, the New York Public Library, the Brooklyn Museum of Art, the Art Institute of Chicago, the Los Angeles County Museum of art, the Philadelphia Museum of Art, and the Philadelphia Public Library, the Everhart Museum, Scranton, Princeton University, Museum, New Jersey, and the Earth and Mineral Sciences Museum & Art Gallery at The Pennsylvania State University.
