= Claude Clark =

American painter (1915–2001)

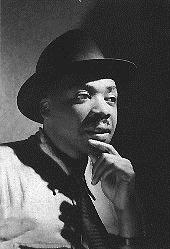
- Claude Clark in earlier years
- Born: November 11, 1915; Rockingham, Georgia, U.S.
- Died: April 21, 2001 (aged 85); Oakland, California, U.S.
- Education: Philadelphia Museum School of Art, Barnes Foundation, Sacramento State University (BA), University of California, Berkeley (MA)
- Known for: Painting, Black Studies Curriculum, West Coast Black Arts Movement
- Notable work: Resting, Guttersnipe, Rain, Freedom Morning, Raising the Cross, Black Arts Perspective, A Black Teachers Guide to a Black Visual Arts Curriculum
- Spouse: Diama (Effie) Lockhart
- Website: www.claudeclarkart.com

Claude Clark (November 11, 1915 – April 21, 2001) was an American painter, printmaker and art educator. Clark's subject matter was the diaspora of African American culture, including dance scenes, street urchins, marine life, landscapes, and religious and political satire images executed primarily with a palette knife.

== Early life ==
Claude Clark was born on a tenant farm in Rockingham, Georgia November 11, 1915. In early August 1923, Clark's parents left the south for a better life in Philadelphia, Pennsylvania during the Great Migration. Clark attended Roxborough High School where he wrote poetry but also discovered a talent for painting. His Sunday School teacher encouraged him to exhibit in Sunday school class and at church.

Clark studied at the Philadelphia Museum School of Industrial Art (now the University of the Arts (Philadelphia)), (1935–1939), following high school graduation. He applied to and was eventually accepted to the Barnes Foundation in 1939.

In 1941, Claude met the daughter of an African Methodist Episcopal Church minister, Effie May Lockhart from California. They married in June 1943 and formed a partnership in art, education and philosophy. He continued his paint studies at The Barnes Foundation while teaching art in the Philadelphia Public School system during the early years of their marriage. The couple moved to Alabama and finally California while continuing their careers.

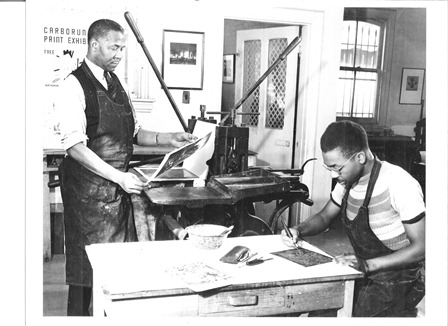
Claude Clark working with Dox Thrash

During the Great Depression Clark contacted the Artists Union for work through the Works Progress Administration (WPA). He worked with the WPA from 1939 to 1942. Clark joined the graphics art shop where he worked with Raymond Steth and Dox Thrash.

Clark was the subject of many articles and publications. He also was the author of A Black Art Perspective, a Black Teachers Guide to a Black Visual Arts Curriculum, Merritt Press 1970. As a member of the Black West Coast Arts Movement, he co-developed the first African American Studies curriculum. He also mentored and supported many young emerging scholars and artists.

== Education ==
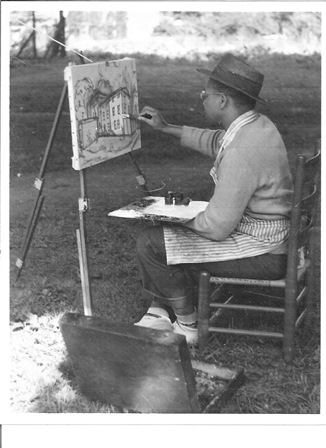
Claude Clark working with a palette knife.

Claude Clark attended high school in Philadelphia, Pennsylvania, graduating from Roxborough High School. From 1935 to 1939, Clark studied at the Philadelphia Museum School of Industrial Art (later the University of the Arts) on full scholarship. While studying there, he came across the work of Van Gogh. Van Gogh's style and method formed the basis of Clark's approach to drawing and painting, with thick creamy texture and loosely applied paint using a palette knife.

In 1939 Clark applied to the Barnes Foundation in Merion, Pennsylvania and was accepted. Clark studied at Barnes from 1939 to 1944. The Albert Barnes collection consisted of an array of works that included African art, European Impressionism and American art. He was able to investigate the hundreds of original “old masters” in the collection and modernist works and to study first hand one of the first important collections of African art in America.

While studying at Barnes in 1939, Clark found a job through the Federal Arts Project of the Works Progress Administration (WPA). He also performed independent research from 1944 to 1958. Clark moved his family to Talladega, Alabama and subsequently Sacramento, California. He received a BA from Sacramento State University in 1958 and a Master of Arts from the University of California, Berkeley in 1962.

== Painter and art educator ==
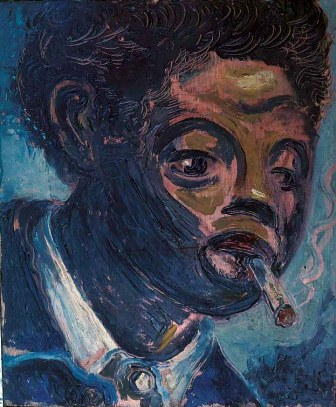
"Guttersnipe" is an oil painting on wood panel done in 1942 by Claude Clark. It is part of the de Young Museum collection in San Francisco, CA

Clark matured in art by recognizing his opportunity to develop without being constrained by the racism, poverty and inherent inequality of circumstance prejudice and labels bring. His work exhibited social realism, modern and abstract styles. When Clark could not afford paint, he salvaged throw away paint cans from trash bins in the back of art schools and mixed his own. Unable to afford to buy paint brushes and chemicals to clean them, he mastered use of the palette knife.

Clark painted and exhibited from a very early age and sold his first works in his early twenties. Collectors continue to seek Clark's works 70 years later. Clark worked at various jobs throughout the late 1930s and mid-1940s before accepting a position as an art instructor with Philadelphia Public school in 1945–1948. Philadelphia artist Reba Dickerson-Hill studied privately with him in the 1940s.

Clark became interested in working for a Black college as his interest in African and African American history developed further. He accepted a position at Talladega College, Talladega, Alabama, as an associate professor of art (1948–1955). Clark painted, taught, exhibited and researched his interest further while supporting his family consisting of a wife Diama (Effie), son Claude Lockhart Clark and daughter Alice.

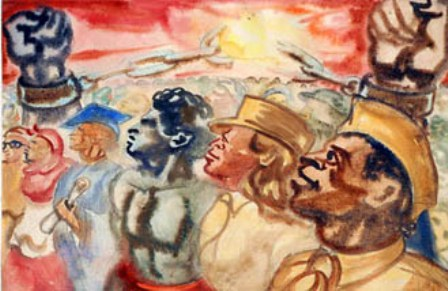
“Freedom Morning” is a transparent watercolor done on paper in 1941 by Claude Clark. This painting was done in Philadelphia, Pennsylvania and is part of the .

In 1955, while teaching at Talladega, Clark began feeling the financial pressures and made the decision to move his family to his wife's native state of California to seek greater opportunity. Clark enrolled in Sacramento State University and taught art classes to other undergraduate students while simultaneously obtaining his Bachelor of Arts degree. Following graduation in 1958, Clark accepted an art instruction position with Alameda County, California (1958–1967) and eventually secured a faculty position within the University of California system as an art instructor (Merritt College, 1968–1981).

Clark helped curate the first national African American exhibition at the Oakland Museum in 1967.

Clark continued to paint, research and exhibit throughout this period. Clark worked from his studio in Oakland, California following his Merritt College retirement from 1981 to 1998. He has exhibited in the United States, Africa, Caribbean, Europe and South America.

He died in Oakland, California, on April 21, 2001, after a long illness.

His work was included in the 1985 exhibition Two Centuries of Black American Art at the Los Angeles County Museum and the 2015 exhibition We Speak: Black Artists in Philadelphia, 1920s-1970s at the Woodmere Art Museum.

== Public collections ==
Clark's work is in the collection of Howard University, the Metropolitan Museum of Art, the National Afro-American Museum and Cultural Center, the Philadelphia Museum of Art, the Smithsonian American Art Museum, and the de Young Museum.

== Awards ==
- Silver Medal, St. Nicholas League, 1933
- Barnes Foundation Fellowship, 1942
- Carnegie Fellowship, 1950

== See also ==
- African-American art
- List of Federal Art Project artists
