= Donald Teskey =

Irish painter

Donald Teskey RHA
- Born: 1956 (age 69–70); County Limerick, Ireland
- Education: Limerick School of Art and Design
- Known for: Oil painting of landscapes
- Elected: Royal Hibernian Academy, Aosdána
- Website: donaldteskey.com

Donald Teskey RHA (born 1956) is an Irish painter. He is a member of Aosdána.

== Early life ==
Teskey was born in County Limerick in 1956. He grew up in Rathkeale and graduated from Limerick School of Art and Design in 1978.

== Career ==
In 1981 he received a prize for drawing at EVA International, and in 1995 he was presented with the Fergus O'Ryan Award. Originally he was a draughtsman, only moving to painting in the 1990s, depicting Dublin city and later moving to rural landscapes.

In 2003 he was elected a member of the Royal Hibernian Academy. In 2005, Limerick City Gallery of Art hosted Tidal Narratives, an exhibition of Teskey's paintings and drawings coinciding with the publication of a book by Gandon Editions. In 2006 he was elected to Aosdána.

According to deVeres Auctions, "His paintings depict gritty urbanity through thick applied paint with brushes and knives. The result is a painting with visceral physicality. At this time Teskey painted from photographs but after a prolonged trip to Mayo in 2000, he began painting landscapes from drawings. His subjects now lie predominantly in the landscape of the Western seaboard, but his work has maintained its urban character." Oliver Sears Gallery says that "Teskey’s works interpret the connection between prehistory and the land and man’s emergence from the sea."

Donald Teskey has made prints in carborundum and intaglio with Stoney Road Press since 2009.
