= Benjamin Britt =

American painter

- Born: May 4, 1923; Winfall, North Carolina
- Died: June 26, 1996 (aged 73); Kensington, Philadelphia, Pennsylvania

Benjamin Franklin (Ben) Britt (May 5, 1923 – June 26, 1996) was a figurative, surrealist and abstract painter, and art teacher. His subjects were African American culture, religion and children, which he captured in oil and charcoals. Britt signed his works "B. Britt," dotting the "i" with tiny round circles.

== Early life and education ==
Benjamin Franklin Roundtree was born on May 4, 1923, in Winfall, North Carolina. His parents changed their surname to Britt after being forced to flee from their home state to Philadelphia. According to Britt's son Stanford, the name change came about as follows: Britt's father got into a fight with his white employer, hit him with a shovel and killed him. The father went into hiding. His mother's white employer told her to use his last name and leave town, fearing that the Ku Klux Klan would come after the family.

When his family moved to Philadelphia, Britt was around six or seven years old. In North Carolina, he was close to his mother's father, a Baptist minister, who read Bible verses to him. Several of Britt's earliest paintings bear religious titles – "Yield Not," "Wife of Lot," "Prodigal Son."

Britt grew up in North Philadelphia and attended Dobbins Technical High School where he met his future wife Marjorie who was studying to be a beautician (years later, he and his brother would build a beauty shop for her in the basement of their home). Britt was taking classes in commercial art. One of his teachers at Dobbins was artist Samuel Joseph Brown Jr. Britt graduated in 1943.

For two years, Britt served in the Coast Guard, traveling to France and England. When he returned home, he studied at the Hussian School of Art (1947–1950), the Philadelphia College of Art (1951) and the Art Students League in New York (1952–1953).

== His style and perception of art ==
Britt was a surrealist early in his career. He was described as a "surrealist painter" in a 1951 news article about an exhibit by the Guild of Allied Arts at the Richard Allen Auditorium. He was a member of a panel of artists who displayed their works and took questions from the audience.

He paints "intangibles – ideas and moods – ‘things which exist but cannot be handled,’ as he calls them," noted one writer. "His use of color depends on the concept or emotion which he is describing and range from monochromatic to multicolored."

Britt could not live off his art alone, so he worked various jobs – including machinist and cab driver - while painting in his studio. In 1963, he owned a blueprint business that he housed in a building where he displayed his artwork in a gallery in a front room.

He gave up the day jobs and started painting full time in 1963. It had taken him 15 years to reach that milestone. To pay the bills, he painted custom-made artwork for clients, sitting down with them over a cup of coffee to determine their tastes and attitudes, and even taking a look inside their homes and the wall where the painting will be hung. He acknowledged to a reporter that it was not the traditional way to paint but it beat working an eight-hour job that he hated. He was being practical and esthetic at the same time.

In between painting by commission, Britt created paintings that pleased him. Those include surreal paintings and abstracts, as well as ones with a social commentary bent. One such painting was "Soul Brothers," which showed the heads of Black, Native American and white persons signifying that humans are inherently alike. He usually got his ideas for his paintings from a passing figure or a fleeting sound – the little things that most people overlook. Sometimes he might be working on one piece, get an idea, stop to start it on another canvas and come back to it later, he said. As a result, he could be working on three or four pieces at a time.

He was happiest, he said, when he was at his easel. "This is life to me and if I had to give it up I might as well give up living."

In 1969, Britt was commissioned to paint a portrait of Dr. Martin Luther King Jr. to hang in Joseph Pennell Elementary School in Philadelphia. "I wanted to do something unlike anything that had been painted of him before," Britt said at the unveiling. It depicted King as a minister and civil rights leader. Britt's works are also in many private collections.

== Awards and shows ==
In his 1960 book American Negro Art, author Cedric Dover predicted that Britt would be among the young artists who, although missing from his book, would have a "prominent place" in the history of Black art.

Starting in the 1950s, Britt began and maintained a long relationship with the Wharton Centre, a social service agency in North Philadelphia that hosted a youth arts program. He was a member of the board of directors, art director and art teacher. In 1952, his painting "Red Moon" won second place in a juried Wharton exhibit, which featured five artists associated with the center. One of the judges was African American artist Paul Keene. The painting was purchased by the center. In 1965, he won the first annual Popular Prize for his painting "Yield Not" in a show at the Wharton's Rosenbaum Art Center.

Britt was a member of the Les Beaux Arts club (along with artist Reba Dickerson-Hill) and worked on its art committee in the late 1940s into 1950s. He won the group's first prize for best abstract. Founded in 1933, the organization was a group of Black people in art, music and literature that held events around those subjects.

He also taught at YMCAs in Germantown and Center City, a Salvation Army branch and the Kensington Neighbors United Civic Association. He also mentored young and older artists.

The 1950s was a stellar decade for Britt, who won several monetary awards in the prestigious Atlanta University’s "Annual Exhibition of Paintings, Sculpture and Prints by Negro Artists." He won three times in both juried and popular ballot competitions, along with a win in 1964. In 1951, Britt was one of four runners-up for the Purchase Prize, the top prize, for his entry "Salutamos Mortamus." In 1957, he won the Purchase Prize for the best figure painting in oil for "Yield Not," a jury award.

In 1958, he won by overwhelming popular vote the Purchase Prize for oils, this time for "Pink Sand No. 2," a photo of which ran in the university's 1958 quarterly bulletin. The NAACP’s Crisis magazine acknowledged his win in its June–July issue that year. In 1964, he won the first prize for any subject in oil by popular vote for his painting "Barbara."

Prize-winning works in the yearly competition became part of Atlanta University's collection. Britt's "Yield Not" was presented in a 1974 traveling show of 50 works the university acquired through its competitions, which ran from 1942 to 1970. A photo of "Yield Not" was on the cover of the March 1974 bulletin promoting the show titled "Highlights from the Atlanta University Collection of Afro-American Art." It traveled to 10 cities across the country.

Britt's "Pink Sand" was exhibited at the Philadelphia Museum of Art in 1955.

Along with galleries and museums, Britt exhibited in homes, churches, hotels, apartment buildings and outdoors. In 1965, he won second place in oils in the first sidewalk art show sponsored by the Mayfair Merchants Association in this Northeast Philadelphia neighborhood. His works were represented in Unity Day on the Benjamin Franklin Parkway in Philadelphia - set up in the Art and Literacy Pavilion by October Gallery. He also was represented in the October Gallery's annual Art Expos.

Britt was a staple at the Rittenhouse Square Fine Art Show and the Atlantic City Show on the Boardwalk. In 1981, his work was among those in an exhibit at the Pennsylvania Governor's Mansion mounted by the Afro-American Historical and Cultural Museum (now the African American Museum in Philadelphia). The paintings were from the museum and Philadelphia collectors. The Britt piece was "Man with a Conscience" from a private collection.

In 1969, he was among 200 Black artists featured in a major show at the Philadelphia Civic Center Museum in cooperation with the Philadelphia School District. The show, titled "Afro-American Artists 1800-1969," included the most important Black artists from across the country.

At Studio Five in New York in 1975, he painted live models during the show, where he was touted as "one of the most talented artists of this era…His surrealistic paintings and semi-abstracts are conversational pieces that are easily understood and appreciated." In 1988, he was one of four Philadelphia artists, including Leroy Johnson, in an exhibit titled "Directions 4" at the Afro-American Historical and Cultural Museum where he also gave a gallery lecture.

In 1960, he was represented in the Pyramid Club, a social organization of Black professional men that held an annual art exhibit starting in 1941. He was joined in its 1960 show by Howard N. Watson, Reba Dickerson-Hill, Robert Jefferson, Samuel J. Brown Jr. and Dox Thrash.

== Later years ==
In 2015, an untitled abstract that Britt completed in the 1950s was featured in an exhibition of Black artists at the Woodmere Art Museum. The exhibition was titled "We Speak: Black Artists in Philadelphia, 1920s-1970s." Britt's painting is in the museum's collection.

In 2021, Britt was included in the re-creation of artist Percy Ricks exhibition titled "Afro-American Images 1971" at the National Guard Armory in Wilmington, DE. He submitted "Alpha" and "Taurus" in Ricks' show. The 2021 show was organized by the Delaware Art Museum, which snubbed Ricks and his organization Aesthetic Dynamics Inc. when he reached out for support in 1971.

Britt, who was divorced, died in his home in Kensington, Philadelphia on June 26, 1996, of heart failure.

== Collections ==
- Atlanta University (Collection at Clark Atlanta University)
- Wharton Centre (Closed, records at Temple University Libraries)
- Woodmere Art Museum
- Philadelphia School District
- W. Leon and Doris Bullock Collection
- Melvin Holmes Collection of African American Art
- Free Library of Philadelphia, Print and Picture Collection

== Exhibitions ==
- Atlanta University 1951, 1957, 1958, 1964
- Free Library of Philadelphia
- Wharton Centre, 1952, 1965
- Philadelphia Museum of Art, 1955
- Lee Cultural Center, Philadelphia Department of Recreation, 1962 1972
- Finkel Gallery, 1959, 1963
- Friends Neighborhood Guild, 1959
- YWCA Germantown, 1962
- The Peek Hole art gallery, 1966
- Zoar United Methodist Church, 1966
- Southwest-Belmont Branch YWCA, 1967
- The Art Barn, 1967
- Facison Art Gallery, 1968, 1971
- La Salle College, 1969, 1977
- Philadelphia Civic Center Museum, 1969
- Allens Lane Art Center, 1970
- Smith-Mason Gallery of Art, 1971
- National Guard Armory, 1971
- Cheyney State College, 1971
- Ridgeway Recreation Center, 1974
- Studio Five, New York, 1975
- University Museum, University of Pennsylvania, 1975
- Uchoraji Gallery, W.E.B. DuBois College House, University of Pennsylvania, 1976
- Balch Institute for Ethnic Studies, 1980
- Afro-American Historical and Cultural Museum 1987, 1988
- Heritage Art Gallery, 1989
- Chosen Image Black Art Gallery, 1990
- Art Gallery at Gloucester County College, 1990
- October Gallery, 1987, 1991
- Gallery 50, 1995
- Frank Guaracini Jr. Fine & Performing Arts Center, Rowan College, 1995
- Woodmere Art Museum, 2015
- Delaware Art Museum, 2021
