= Cheryl Anne Lorance =

American sculptor, painter, goldsmith, and printmaker

Cheryl Anne Lorance (born 1969 in Muncie, Indiana) is an American sculptor, painter, goldsmith, and intaglio printmaker. She graduated from Ball State University (painting and sculpture). She received both a graduate assistantship and Creative Arts Grant from the same university and later completed a masters thesis on the subject of bronze patination. In 1996, she established herself in Santa Fe, New Mexico, but has since returned to her home town of Muncie, Indiana.

== Recognition ==
Lorance won a Stutz Artist's Gallery residency for 2002 and for 2014–2015. Her work was included in the 2008 book, 100 Santa Fe Etchers.

At the 2008 Scottsdale Art Festival, she won first place in sculpture. Her work, Birth of Venus (2011), was selected for a juried show at the Kinsey Institute in 2012.
