= Collagraphy =

Printmaking process

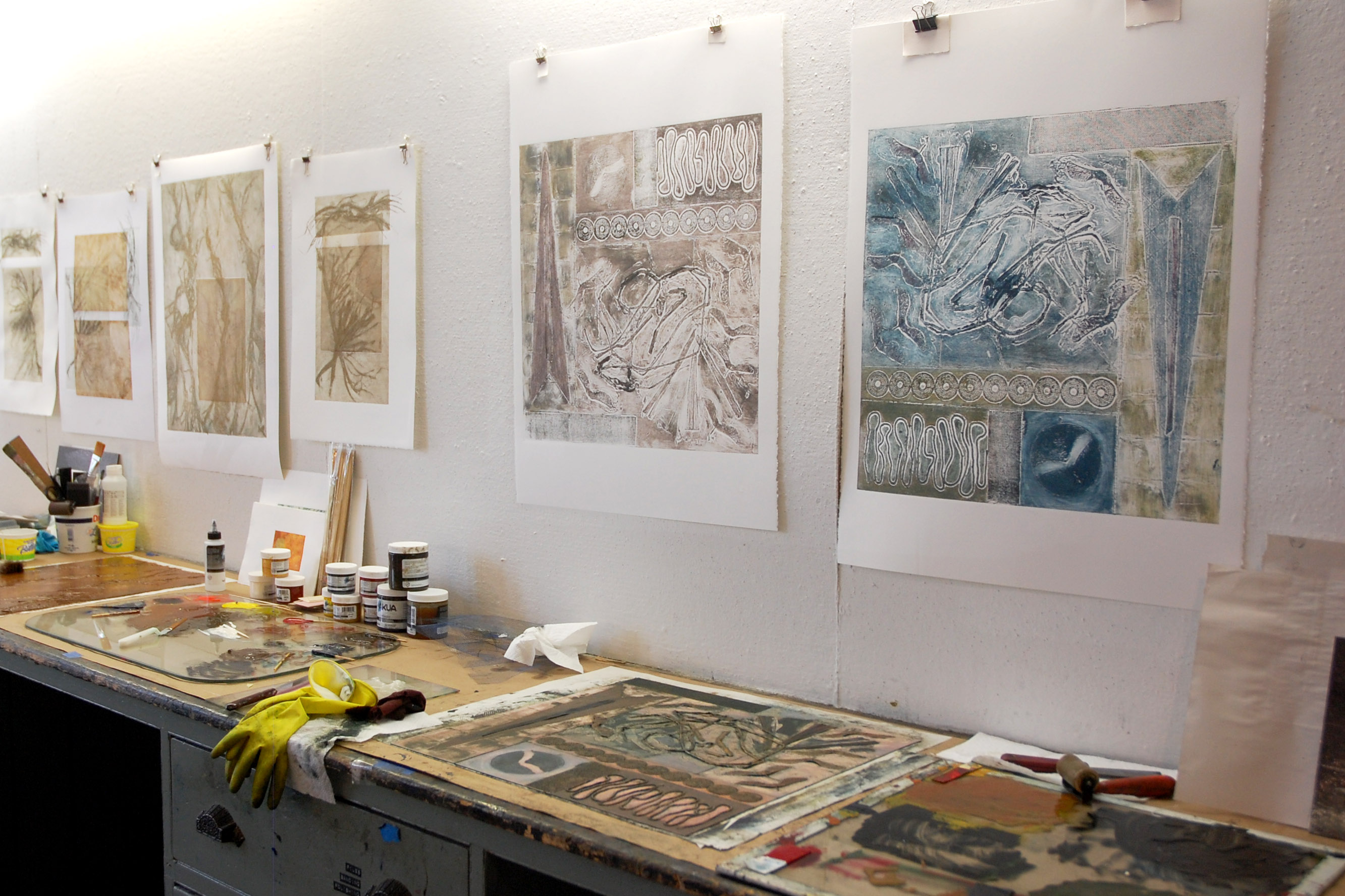
Collagraphs demonstrating both relief and intaglio-inking.

Collagraphy (sometimes spelled collography) is a printmaking process in which materials are glued or sealed to a rigid substrate (such as paperboard or wood) to create a plate. Once inked, the plate becomes a tool for imprinting the design onto paper or another medium. The resulting print is termed a collagraph.

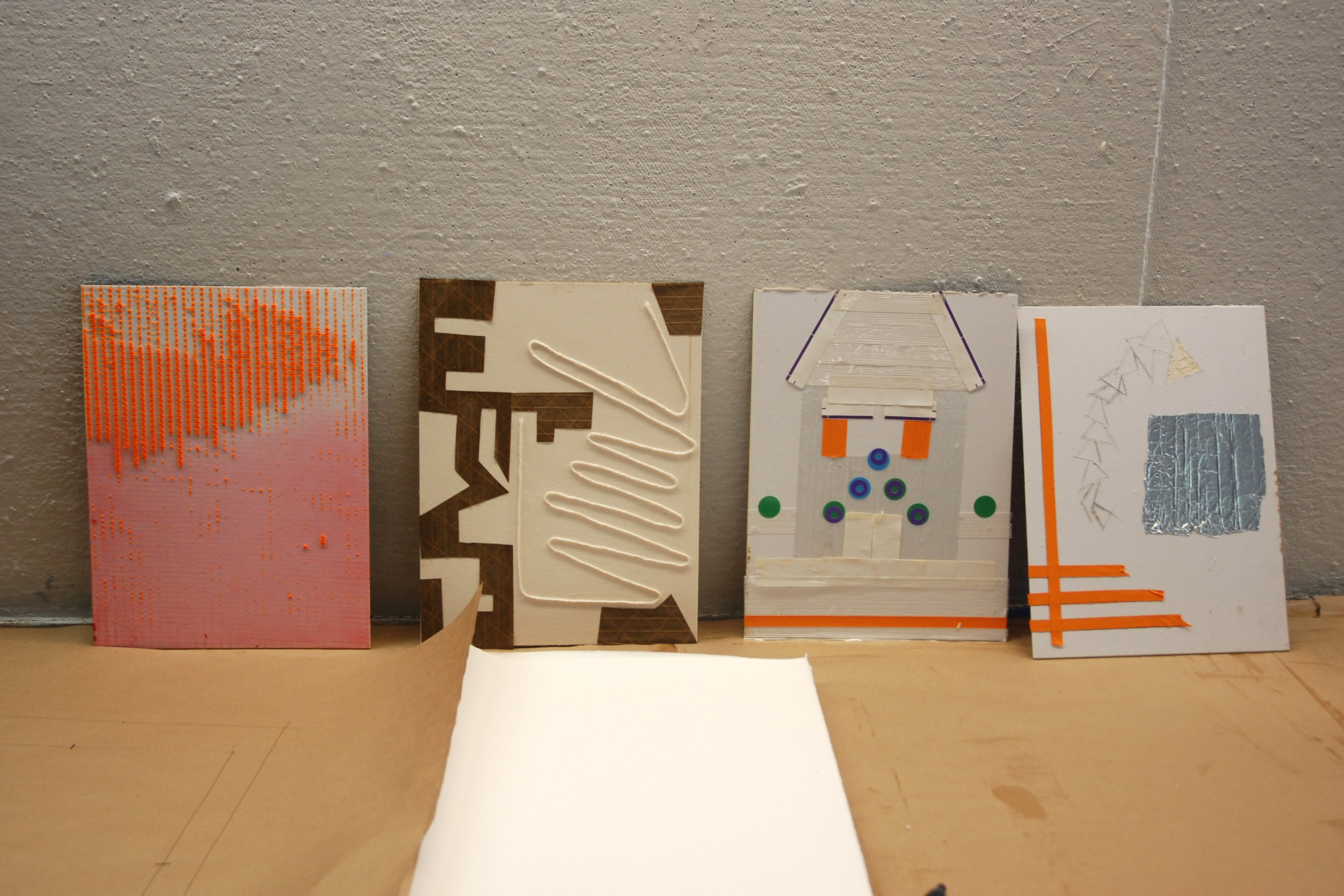
Examples of collagraph plates using a variety of materials

The term "collagraph" was coined by Glen Alps in the 1950s, and is derived from the Greek word koll or kolla, meaning glue, and graph, meaning the activity of drawing.

Artists use a variety of materials in collagraphy, including yarn, fabric, tape, different varieties of cut paper or card, leaves, feathers, and acrylic mediums. The application of ink onto the collagraph plate is versatile, consisting of intaglio-inking into recesses, brayer or paintbrush inking onto relief surfaces, or a combination of these methods. A print can be made with, or without use of a press.

== See also ==
- Carborundum printmaking
- Beatrice Winn Berlin
