= Hugh Mesibov =

American artist (1916–2016)

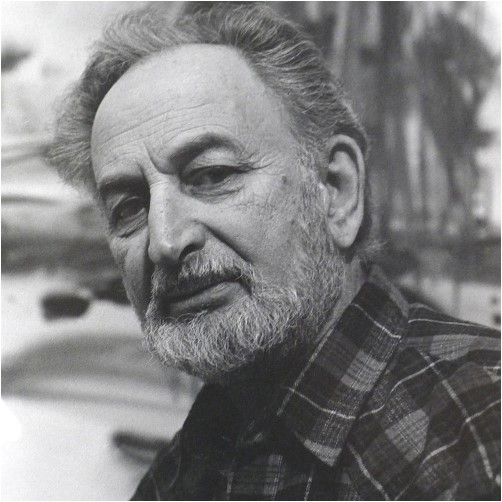
- Born: 1916; Philadelphia, Pennsylvania, U.S.
- Died: 2016 (aged 99–100); Chestnut Ridge, New York
- Education: Fleisher Memorial Art School; Pennsylvania Academy of Fine Arts; Barnes Foundation, Philadelphia, Pennsylvania
- Known for: Painting, etching, carborundum print-making, lithograph, sculpture
- Movement: Abstract expressionism
- Spouse(s): Eudice Mesibov, née Charney

Hugh Mesibov (December 29, 1916 – March 25, 2016 ) was an American abstract expressionist artist who began his career as a federal artist for the Works Progress Administration during the Great Depression and later became a member of the 10th Street galleries and part of the New York School during the 1940s-60s. His work has elements of the mid-20th-century New York artistic experience such as Surrealist and Abstract Expressionist and figurative aspects across several media such as watercolor, oil, and acrylic as well as etchings, lithographs and monoprints. His work has received a global reputation and is included in many collections in the United States and worldwide.

== Life ==
Hugh Mesibov was born in Philadelphia, Pennsylvania in 1916. He began his studies at the Samuel S. Fleisher Art Memorial School, then at the Pennsylvania Academy of Fine Arts and at the Barnes Foundation. During the 1930s, he received funding from the Works Progress Administration. As a Pennsylvania artist, he produced paintings, murals and prints depicting Depression-Era themes of work and society. He worked in the WPA Graphic Arts Workshop (Print Section) in Philadelphia alongside Roswell Weidner, Dox Thrash and Michael J. Gallagher (artist). There, he experimented with printmaking, which led to his co-invention of the Carborundum printmaking process with Thrash and Gallagher. Mesibov also invented the Color Carborundum Printmaking process. One of Mesibov's notable commissions by the United States Department of the Treasury Section of Painting and Sculpture (later known as the Section of Fine Arts) was to paint the mural Steel Industry in the post office in Hubbard, Ohio.

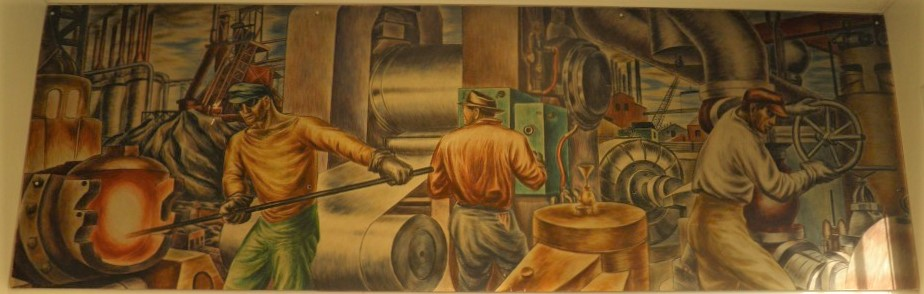
The Steel Industry

By the late 1930s, Mesibov's work displayed aspects of social commentary and current events with cubist, surrealist and modernist elements, such as his abhorrence of war's destruction in "Bombing of Nanking". In 1940, he had his first one-man exhibition at the Carlin Gallery, Philadelphia. During the 1940s, his style increasingly grew abstract, and after the United States entered World War II, he worked at a shipyard in Philadelphia, where his work reflected the ordeal of the war.

After the end of World War II, Mesibov moved to New York City. His first New York one-man show in 1947 was at the Chinese Gallery, of increasingly cubist and abstract work in his preferred medium acrylic on canvas. During this period, he also experimented with artistic influences from earlier eras, which can be seen in his work named Byzantine Figure, which fuses elements of cubist style with forms and colors reminiscent of Byzantine art. In 1948 and 1949, he exhibited at the New School with the Formations Group. During the late 1940s, he opened a studio in Newark, NJ with a fellow New York and Philadelphia ceramicist, Frances Serber, and shared exhibition spaces with Milton Avery, Nell Blaine, Ralph Rosenborg, John Ferron and Boris Margo. The abstract expressionist painters soon formed a school known as “The Club,” of which Mesibov was a member. Mesibov was close with Richard Pousette-Dart, Franz Kline and Ibram Lassaw. He also formed professional relationships with Jackson Pollock, Willem de Kooning, Philip Guston, Adolph Gottlieb, Robert Motherwell, Barnett Newman, Ad Reinhardt and Mark Rothko. In 1949, he married an opera singer named Eudice Mesibov, née Charney. During the 1950s, Mesibov had shows at the Morris Gallery (1955), the Artists Gallery (1956, 1958) and the Gallery Mayer (1959).

Mesibov was dedicated to landscape painting during this period and made visits to various sites for painting. From 1951 to 1954, he produced increasingly abstract expressionist series of mostly watercolors based on the summertime landscapes of Aspen, Colorado, and later, from 1956 to 1958, of Monhegan, Maine. His landscape phase, combined with his development of abstract expressionism, found an outlet in famous literary works during the 1960s. Inspired by Samuel Taylor Coleridge's Rime of the Ancient Mariner and Miguel de Cervantes Saavedra's Don Quixote, he produced a series based on each.

By the late 1960s, his acrylics on canvas and watercolors were becoming larger, at times 8 by 10 feet. In 1972, Mesibov was commissioned to paint a mural for the Temple Beth El in Spring Valley, New York, which was composed of three combined canvases each measuring 6 by 16 feet (1.8 by 4.9 m). Drawing on inspiration from biblical literature, the mural depicts the events from the Book of Job, primarily Job's challenge to God, his anguish, atonement and restitution.

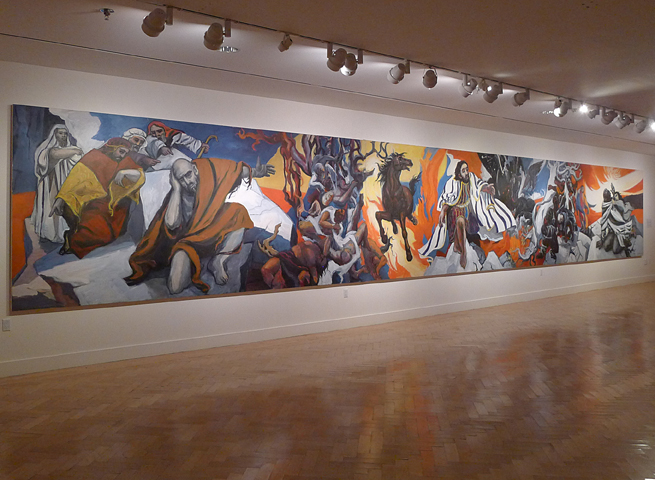
Hugh Mesibov's Book of Job Mural Exhibit at the Yeshiva University Museum (2016-2017)

By the 1980s, Mesibov restored his long abiding interest in pastoral and seasonal themes using primarily watercolors, of which he produced two major series, the “Pond” and “Sunroom” series. During the 1990s, he restarted experimenting with new techniques in print-making using various pigments, papers and adhesives.

His work is well known in Rockland County, New York, where he lived from 1959, and his reputation as an American artist is not confined only to the New York metropolitan area, but stretches from his birthplace of Philadelphia across the United States of America, and around the world. In 1966, he joined the faculty of the State University of New York at Rockland Community College as a professor of fine art. He retired in 1989 and became Professor Emeritus in 1993.

Over the course of his career, he received the Executive Arts Award for Visual Arts, Rockland Council on the Arts (1988) and an Arts Grant from the New York State Council on the Arts (1995/96). In 1997, he had a retrospective exhibition at the Rockland Center for the Arts and his work was shown at the Blue Hill Art and Cultural Center in Pearl River, New York, during 2003 and 2004, as well as the Morris M. Pine Library, Fairlawn, New Jersey (2006).

== Selected exhibitions ==
The following is a selected list of single-person exhibitions of Mesibov's work.

- 1940 Carlen Gallery, Philadelphia, Pennsylvania
- 1945 Philadelphia Art Alliance, Philadelphia, Pennsylvania
- 1947 Chinese Gallery, New York, New York
- 1952 Elizabeth Nelson Gallery, Chicago, Illinois
- 1952 Bookshop Gallery, Aspen, Colorado
- 1954 Bookshop Gallery, Aspen, Colorado
- 1954 Gallery East, New York, New York
- 1955 Morris Gallery, New York, New York
- 1956 Artist's Gallery, New York, New York
- 1958 Artist's Gallery, New York, New York
- 1958 Sunken Meadow Gallery, Kings Park, Long Island, New York
- 1959 Gallery Mayer, New York, New York
- 1965 Babcock Galleries, New York, New York
- 1966 Market Fair Gallery, Nyack, New York
- 1968 High Point Gallery, Lenox, Massachusetts
- 1974 Union of American Hebrew Congregations, New York, New York
- 1979 Edward Hopper House Art Center, Nyack, New York
- 1983 Ringwood Manor Associations of Arts, Ringwood, New Jersey
- 1987 Wyckoff Gallery, Wyckoff, New Jersey
- 1987 Dolan/Maxwell Galleries, Philadelphia, Pennsylvania
- 1992 Sragow Gallery, New York, New York
- 1993 Wyckoff Gallery, Wyckoff, New Jersey
- 1997 Rockland Center for the Arts, West Nyack, New York
- 2002 Susan Teller Gallery, New York, New York
- 2005 National Academy of Design, New York, New York
- 2006 Susan Teller Gallery, New York, New York
- 2008 British Museum, London, UK
- 2010 Susan Teller Gallery, New York, New York
- 2011 Blue Hill Plaza Cultural Center, Pearl River, New York
- 2012 Lyman Allyn Art Museum, Connecticut College, New London, Connecticut
- 2013 Susan Teller Gallery, New York, New York
- 2014 Susan Teller Gallery, New York, New York
- 2015 Center for Contemporary Printmaking, Norwalk, Connecticut
- 2016 Yeshiva University Museum, Center for Jewish History, New York, New York
- 2017 Summerset Gallery, Shanghai, China
- 2018 Zimmerli Art Museum at Rutgers University, New Brunswick, New Jersey
- 2018 Pennsylvania Academy of the Fine Arts, Philadelphia, Pennsylvania

== Selected collections ==
Hugh Mesibov's works are part of the permanent or temporary collections of the following institutions:

- Smithsonian American Art Museum, Renwick Gallery, Washington DC
- Crystal Bridges Museum of American Art, Bentonville, Arkansas
- Barnes Foundation, Philadelphia, Pennsylvania
- Pennsylvania Academy of Fine Arts, Philadelphia, Pennsylvania
- Metropolitan Museum of Art, New York, New York
- Whitney Museum of American Art
- New York University and Syracuse University, New York
- Philadelphia Museum of Art, the Free Library of Philadelphia, Merion Station and the Carnegie Library, Pittsburgh, Pennsylvania
- Worcester Museum of Art, Worcester, Massachusetts
- James A. Michener Art Museum, Doylestown, Pennsylvania
- Library of Congress, Washington DC
- Art Institute of Chicago and the Mary and Leigh Block Museum of Art, Northwestern University, Evanston, Illinois
- Wolfsonian/Florida International University, Miami Beach
- Museum of Art, the University of Oregon, Eugene, OR
- Newark Museum, New Jersey; the Baltimore Museum of Art, Maryland
- British Museum, London
