= Henri Goetz =

American-French painter

Henri Bernard Goetz
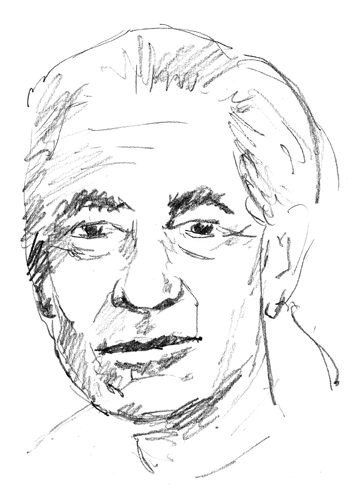
- Born: September 29, 1909; New York City, U.S.
- Died: August 12, 1989 (aged 79); Nice, France
- Education: Grand Central School of Art, New York; Académie Colarossi, Paris; Académie Julian, Paris; Académie de la Grande Chaumière, Paris
- Known for: Painting, etching, pastel
- Movement: Surrealism

Henri Bernard Goetz (September 29, 1909 – August 12, 1989) was a French American surrealist painter and engraver. He is known for his artwork, as well as for inventing the carborundum printmaking process. His work is represented in more than 100 galleries worldwide.

== Early life ==
Goetz was born in New York City in 1909. His father ran an electrical plant. He later described his mother as a "quasi-academic" because of the two large parenting books she owned. He began drawing because the books told that a child needs a certain number of hours outside in a day, and as such he was not allowed to come home before six. On one rainy day, he made use of his time by drawing. However, he was frustrated with his clumsy drawing, and tore it up. He later asked his mother to beat him for his failure as an artist.

== Personal life ==
In September 1935, Goetz met Christine Boumeester at the Académie de la Grande Chaumière. Christine was a very shy Dutch painter from Java, Indonesia. Goetz invited her to visit his studio, and she moved in with him several days later. They were married when Christine's parents visited them in Paris. He credited Christine with much of his early development from realism to his more modern surrealist painting style. Around this time he met Hans Hartung, who introduced him to his circle of friends. Through this, he met Fernand Léger and Wassily Kandinsky.

=== World War II ===
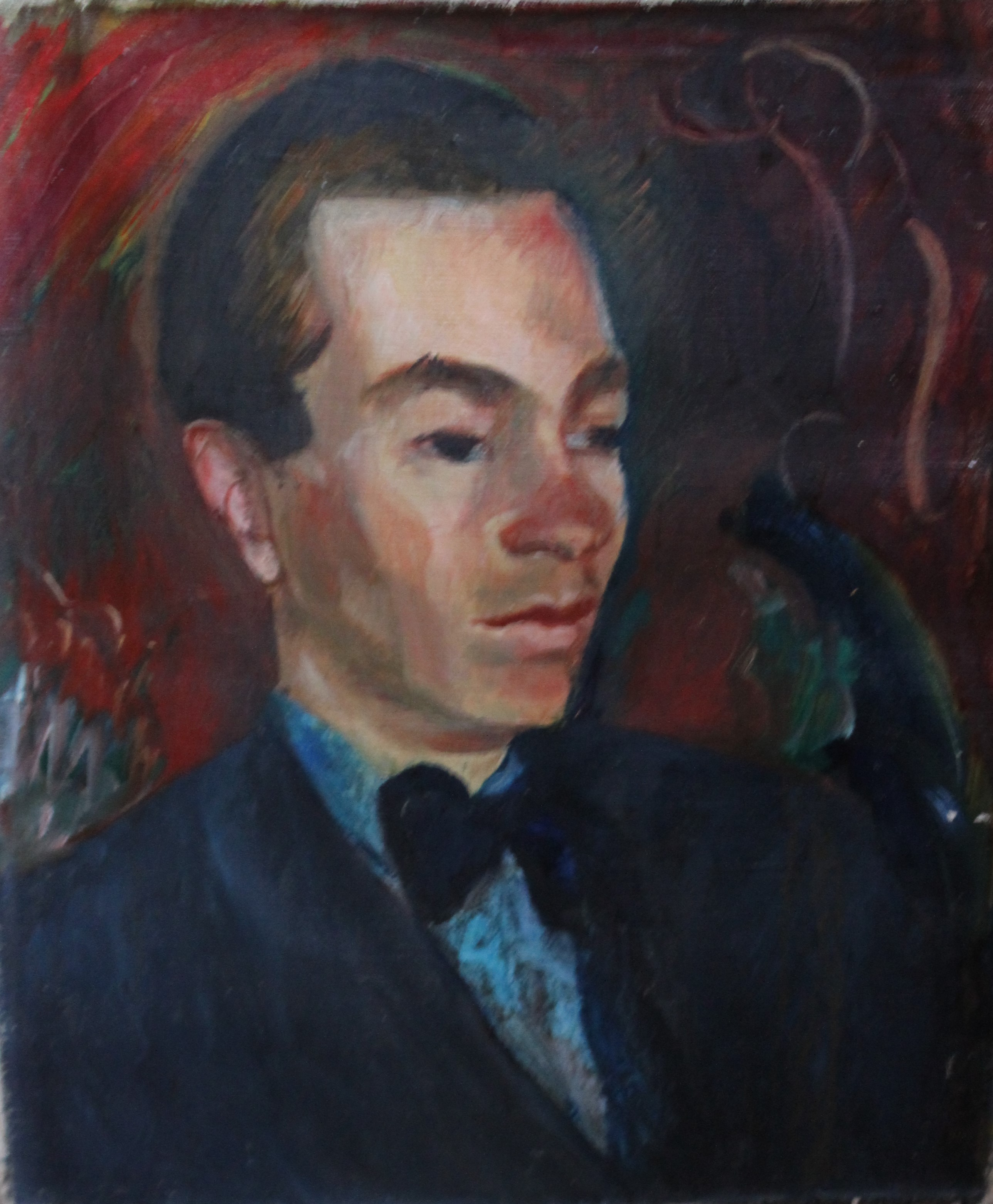
Portrait of Henri Goetz by Evelyn Marc during the 1950s.

As World War II began, both Goetz and his wife worked with the French Resistance. They printed leaflets on a simple printing press and created posters to paste on walls around Paris. However, they primarily worked to forge identity documents. In 1939, Goetz, Christian Dotremont, and Raoul Ubac created La Main à Plume, the first surrealist publication under the Occupation.

The group made false documents for a Czech poet who, upon being caught by the German authorities, told them of the surrealists who would be meeting in a few days. The group was arrested, although Goetz was not among them. However, Ubec was arrested, and the authorities found a note from Goetz detailing instructions on forging identity cards. For this, as well as for Goetz's American nationality, he and Christine were forced to flee to Côte d'Azur.

They moved to Cannes, where Goetz was forced to take on such jobs as cutting sandstone. After the Liberation of Paris in 1944, Goetz and his wife were able to return.

In 1968, Christine became ill. She lived with her illness for three years, before dying in Paris on January 10, 1971. After her death, he came across a number of her journals, which he published in a book called Christine Boumeester's notebooks. He prefaced the book.

After being hospitalized for an illness, Goetz committed suicide by jumping from the fifth floor of the hospital, dying in Nice, France on August 12, 1989.

== Education ==
When he was eighteen, he left home to attend the Massachusetts Institute of Technology in Cambridge, Massachusetts, where he studied to be an electrical engineer. However, he started taking evening art classes and began to devote his summer vacations to painting instead of apprenticeship. He decided to enroll at Harvard University, also in Cambridge, where he attended art history lectures with the intent of becoming a museum curator. While attending classes in Fogg Museum, he realized he wanted to be an artist. He left Harvard the next year to attend the Grand Central School of Art in New York City, where he enrolled in morning, evening, and night classes. In July, 1930, he decided to leave America to go to Paris, using money he had saved working as a golf caddie and as an apprentice electrical engineer.

== Paris apprenticeship ==
The day after arriving in Paris, Goetz began attending the Académie Colarossi, aiming to split his time between the studios there and those at the Académie Julian and the Académie de la Grande Chaumière. He also frequented the Montparnasse art studios, including the studio of Amédée Ozenfant. He was not interested in formal training, instead looking for somewhere to paint. He began by painting portraiture and studying the nude figure. He stayed in Paris for two years, only returning home once to collect his belongings after deciding to stay in France permanently. However, after these two years, he returned home to stay with his ailing father. After staying with his father for a year, he again returned to Paris. His father died several weeks later. Goetz lived with several other undiscovered artists in France.

In 1934, Goetz met Victor Bauer, an Austrian artist. Bauer taught Goetz of the existence of Pablo Picasso, Georges Braque, Henri Matisse, and Georges Rouault. Bauer also taught Goetz about left-wing politics, Sigmund Freud's ideology, and avant-garde poetry and music. Through Bauer, he was able to show his first painting in a show in London.

== Career ==
In January 1937, Goetz held his first exhibition at the Galerie Bonaparte with his wife. In 1945, after returning to Paris from several years working with the French Resistance forging documents, Goetz worked with René Guilly on a national radio program called The World of Paris. Ubac covered poetry, and Goetz covered painting. Goetz visited a new studio each week and, through this, met with artists such as Pablo Picasso, Constantin Brâncuși, Wassily Kandinsky, Julio González, Francis Picabia, and Max Ernst. He continued broadcasting for six months before giving his position to someone else.

In 1947, Goetz became the subject of a short film by Alain Resnais for the Musée National d'Art Moderne entitled Portrait de Henri Goetz. Goetz showed the film to Gaston Diehl, leading Diehl to commission Resnais to create the film Van Gogh in the following year. Resnais went on to win an Academy Award in 1950 for the Best Short Subject, Two-reel film for Van Gogh.

=== Teaching ===
In 1949, Goetz began to teach a painting class. The class grew so large that he had to move it to the Académie Ranson. After five years of teaching there, he taught for another five years at the Académie de la Grande Chaumière, eventually running two classes due to the number of pupils. He taught at many other schools before finally founding the Académie Goetz. He never charged money for his lessons. Of his students, Goetz said, "Some became excellent artists, and some became fashionable artists, but rarely the same ones became both." In 1968 he accepted a teaching position at École des Beaux-Arts, but the school was closed due to student strikes two weeks later. He then moved to work at Paris 8 University, where he taught painting and etching classes.

=== Etching ===
Goetz and his wife had long worked together to illustrate several books with their etchings. Christine had taken classes in the subject before World War II at the Académie des Beaux-Arts, and had taught Goetz. They collaborated on Georges Hugnet's book, La femme facil, as well as other books. After seeing some of their lithographs, a friend of theirs encouraged them to etch full-time. Johnny Friedlaender gave them a small printing press that he no longer used, and Fin, Pablo Picasso's nephew, helped them modify it. Christine focused mostly on lithography, while Goetz focused mostly on etching. They also helped design silk screens.

=== Carborundum printing ===
Citing a lack of patience and methodical ways, Goetz invented carborundum printmaking in the 1960s. In 1968, La gravure au carborundum, a treatise on carborundum printing, was published by the Maeght Gallery. It was prefaced by Joan Miró. Goetz created many abstract prints using this method. Other artists such as Antoni Clavé, Antoni Tàpies, and in particular, Joan Miró, employed carborundum printing in their work. The technique has since been used by printmakers around the world.

In addition to his carborundum printing research, Goetz undertook extensive research on pastels.
