= Intaglio (printmaking) =

Group of techniques in printing

Depressions are engraved or etched into a flat printing plate. Likely not to scale: grooves can be less than a millimetre wide.

The plate is covered in ink.

The ink is wiped off the surface of the plate, but remains in the grooves.

Paper is placed on the plate and compressed, such as by a heavy roller.

The paper is removed, and the ink has been transferred from the plate to the paper.

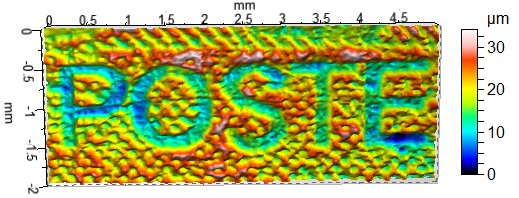
Micro-topography of an ordinary French post stamp (detail) showing the thickness of ink obtained by intaglio. The words la Poste appeared in white on red background and hence corresponds to areas with a lack of ink.

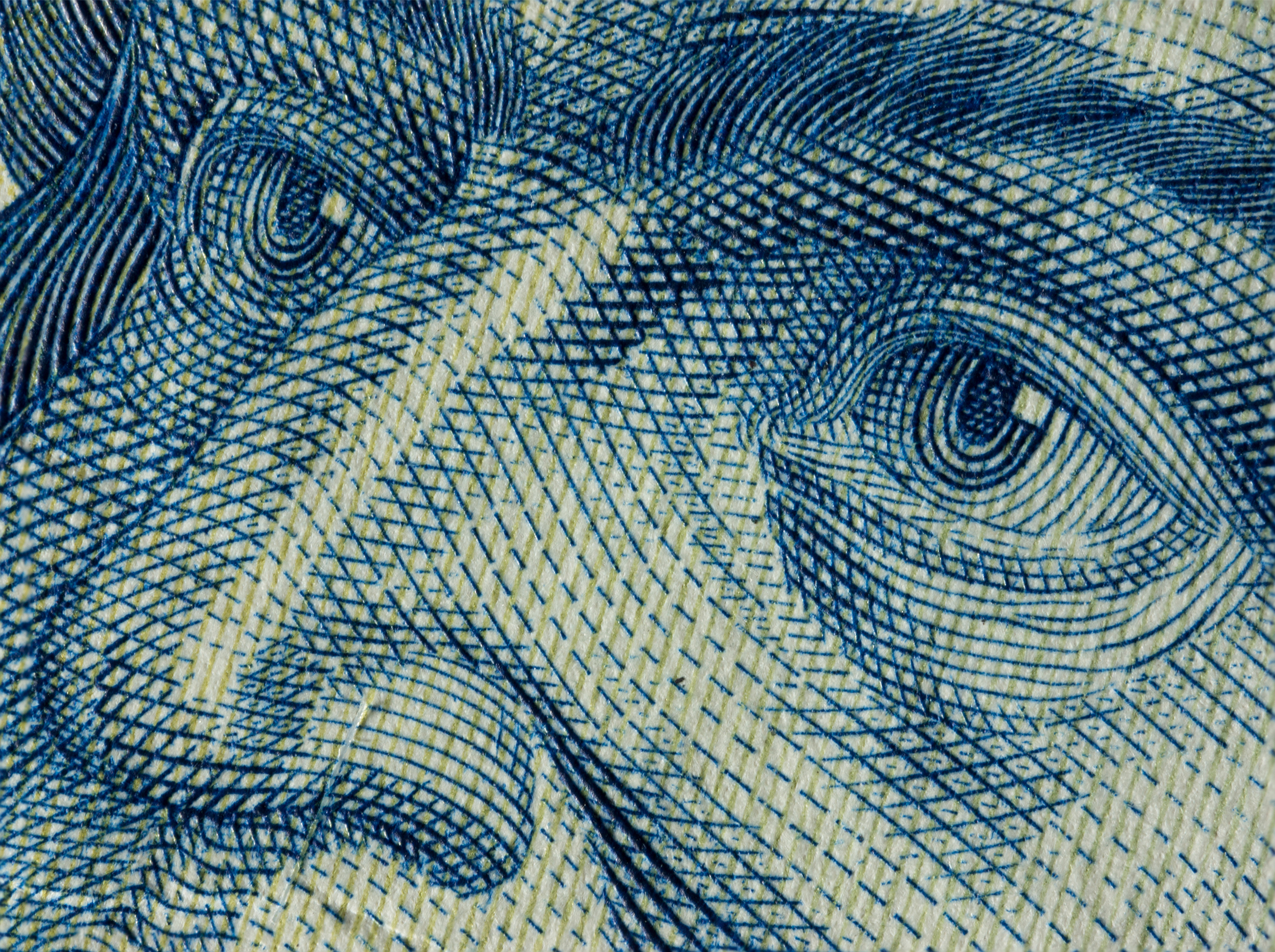
Banknote portrait pattern made with intaglio printing. Denomination: 1000 Hungarian forint. Depicted area: 18.1 by 13.5 millimetres (0.71 in × 0.53 in).

Intaglio (/ɪnˈtæli.oʊ, -ˈtɑːli-/ in-TAL-ee-oh, -TAH-lee-; Italian: [inˈtaʎʎo]) is the group of printing and printmaking techniques in which an image is incised into a surface and the incised line or sunken area holds the ink. It is the direct opposite of a relief print where the parts of the matrix that make the image stand above the main surface.

Normally copper, or in recent times zinc, sheets called plates are used as a surface or matrix, and the incisions are created by etching, engraving, drypoint, aquatint or mezzotint, often in combination. Collagraphs may also be printed as intaglio plates.

After the decline of the main relief technique of woodcut around 1550, the intaglio techniques dominated both artistic printmaking as well as most types of illustration and popular prints until the mid 19th century.

The word "intaglio" describes prints created from plates where the ink-bearing regions are recessed beneath the plate's surface. Though brass, zinc, and other materials are occasionally utilized, copper is the most common material for the plates.

== Process ==
In intaglio printing, the lines to be printed are cut into a metal (e.g. copper) plate by means either of a cutting tool called a burin, held in the hand—in which case the process is called engraving; or through the corrosive action of acid—in which case the process is known as etching.

In etching, for example, the plate is covered in a thin, acid-resistant resin or wax ground. Using etching needles or burins, the artist or writer (etcher) engraves their image through the ground to expose the plate beneath. The plate's ground side is then dipped into acid, or the acid poured onto it. The acid bites into the surface of the plate where it was exposed. Biting is a printmaking term to describe the acid's etching, or incising, of the image; its duration depends on the acid strength, metal's reactivity, temperature, air pressure and the depth desired. After the plate is sufficiently bitten it is removed from the acid bath, the ground is removed gently and the plate is usually dried or cleaned.

To print an intaglio plate, ink or inks are painted, wiped and/or dabbed into the recessed lines (such as with brushes/rubber gloves/rollers). The plate is then rubbed with tarlatan cloth to remove most of its waste (surface ink) and a final smooth wipe is often done with newspaper or old public phone book pages, leaving it in the incisions. Dampened paper will usually be fed against the plate, covered by a blanket, so when pressed by rolling press it is squeezed into the plate's ink-filled grooves with uniform very high pressure. The blanket is then lifted, revealing the paper and printed image. The final stages repeat for each copy needed.

== History ==
Intaglio printmaking emerged in Europe well after the woodcut print, with the earliest known surviving examples being undated designs for playing cards made in Germany, using drypoint technique, probably in the late 1430s. Engraving had been used by goldsmiths to decorate metalwork, including armor, musical instruments and religious objects since ancient times, and the niello technique, which involved rubbing an alloy into the lines to give a contrasting color, also goes back to late antiquity. Scholars and practitioners of printmaking have suggested that the idea of making prints from engraved plates may well have originated with goldsmiths' practices of taking an impression on paper of a design engraved on an object, in order to keep a record of their work, or to check the quality.

Martin Schongauer was one of the most significant early artists in the engraving technique, and Albrecht Dürer is one of the most famous intaglio artists. Italian and Dutch engraving began slightly after the Germans, but were well developed by 1500. Drypoint and etching were also German inventions of the fifteenth century, probably by the Housebook Master and Daniel Hopfer respectively. In the 15th century, woodcut and engraving served to produce both religious and secular imagery. One of the most popular secular uses of engraver's art was in the production of playing cards, a diversion enjoyed by the aristocracy and the common people.

In the nineteenth century, Viennese printer Karel Klíč introduced a combined intaglio and photographic process. Photogravure retained the smooth continuous tones of photography but was printed using a chemically etched copper plate. This permitted a photographic image to be printed on regular paper, for inclusion in books or albums.

In the 1940s and 1950s, the Italian security printer Gualtiero Giori brought intaglio printing into the era of high-technology by developing the first ever six-colour intaglio printing press, designed to print banknotes which combined more artistic possibilities with greater security.

== Intaglio artists ==
- William Blake
- Mike Chaplin
- Albrecht Dürer
- M. C. Escher
- Helen Frank
- Francisco Goya
- Michael Hafftka
- Stanley William Hayter
- Paul César Helleu
- Edward Hopper
- Jasper Johns
- William Kentridge
- Max Klinger
- Käthe Kollwitz
- Mauricio Lasansky
- Martin Lewis
- Lucas van Leyden
- Cheryl Anne Lorance
- Malcolm Myers
- Bruce Onobrakpeya
- Lothar Osterburg
- Gabor Peterdi
- Gene Kloss
- Pablo Picasso
- Anton Pieck
- Krishna Reddy
- Rembrandt
- Félicien Rops
- Barbara Rosiak
- Ludwig von Siegen
- Guillermo Silva Santamaria
- Richard Spare
- Donald Teskey
- Diane Victor
- James Abbott McNeill Whistler

== See also ==
- History of printing
- Rotogravure – a type of intaglio printing
- Viscosity printing
