= Helen Frank =

American artist

Helen Frank is an American artist from New York and New Jersey. She is known for her etchings and watercolors of New York City, New Jersey, arts appreciation, cultural identity, immigration, women's issues, sports, travel and daily life.

== Education ==
Frank attended: Yale University, The New School, Temple University's Tyler School of Fine Arts, Art Students League of New York, and Cooper Union.

== Career ==
Frank's work is in the collections of the Library Of Congress, New York Public Library, New-York Historical Society, Museum of Modern Art, Victoria and Albert Museum, New Jersey State Museum, Newark Public Library, American Museum of Immigration, UNICEF, Lafayette College, New Jersey Center for Visual Arts, Saks Fifth Avenue and New York Life Insurance Company, New York Mets, Drumthwacket and Habitat for Humanity.

Her work has been compared to Daumier by the New York Times.

In 2008, Frank, in collaboration with her daughter, award-winning poet Holly Scalera, created an art and poetry collection based on the lives of the cloistered nuns at the Monastery of Our Lady of the Rosary.

In 2013, she was on the Griffin Art Prize Shortlist.

In 2023, she was featured in the documentary film, Rembrandt Lives in New Jersey, directed by Kasey Child.
