= Carborundum printmaking =

Printmaking technique

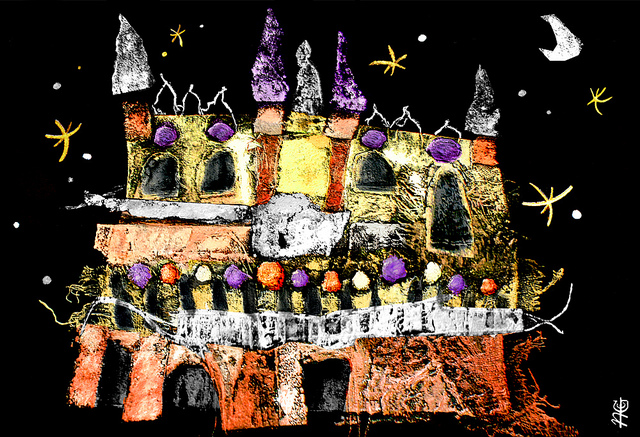
A collagraph printed by re-using materials from the atelier: tarlatan, carborundum, sandpaper, and thread

Carborundum mezzotint, or carborundum aquatint, is a printmaking technique in which the image is created by adding light passages to a dark field. It is a relatively new process invented in the US during the 1930s by Hugh Mesibov, Michael J. Gallagher, and Dox Thrash, an artist working in Philadelphia with the Works Progress Administration (WPA)). "Carborundum Collagraph" collagraph is a different printmaking technique, invented in 1952 by Henri Goetz, an American abstract artist living in Paris. The carborundum mezzotint uses the grits to create pits below the surface of the metal that then hold ink, like traditional mezzotint. The carborundum collagraph creates the image above the surface of the matrix, which does not have to be metal. In one method, the grits are mixed into a paste using an acrylic base that is painted onto the matrix, creating the image much like painting. Once dried, this holds the ink; the wiping and printing are done the same as etching. The techniques described following and below are alternatives to the paste mixture technique, yet all are creating the image above the surface of the matrix. Carborundum collagraph allows artists to work on a large scale. Normally, cardboard or wood plates are coated in a layer of carborundum or screen, and the lights are created by filling in the texture with screen filler or glue. Carborundum prints may be printed as intaglio plates.

Carborundum was originally used by printmakers to grind down lithography stones and is now used in collagraph prints to create gradients of tone and a sandy texture. It works because when the carborundum adheres to the plate the ink sits around it. It can be applied in a number of different ways:

- Painting onto the plate with a liquid glue and then sprinkling the carborundum onto it
- Mixing different amounts of glue with it and then painting them on in sections, the more grit used the darker. Example: one spoon of carborundum to five spoons of glue will be much lighter than five spoons of carborundum to five spoons of glue.
- Using stencils to apply the glue and sprinkling different amounts of carborundum through the different stencils.

To print a carborundum print, the surface is covered in ink, and then the surface is wiped clean with tarlatan cloth or newspaper, leaving ink only in the texture of the screen or carborundum. A damp piece of paper is placed on top, and the plate and paper are run through a printing press that, through pressure, transfers the ink from the recesses of the plate to the paper. Very large editions are not possible as a small amount of carborundum comes off every time it is wiped down.

== Uses ==
Contrast with relief printing, and with planographic printing techniques such as lithography.

== Artists ==
- Gillian Ayres
- Howard Hodgkin
- Hugh Mesibov
- Joan Miró
- Roberto Matta
- Donald Teskey
- Dox Thrash
- Joe Tilson
- Roswell Weidner

== See also ==
- Collograph
- Intaglio (printmaking)
