= Samuel Joseph Brown Jr. =

American visual artist and educator (1907–1994)

Samuel Joseph Brown, Jr.
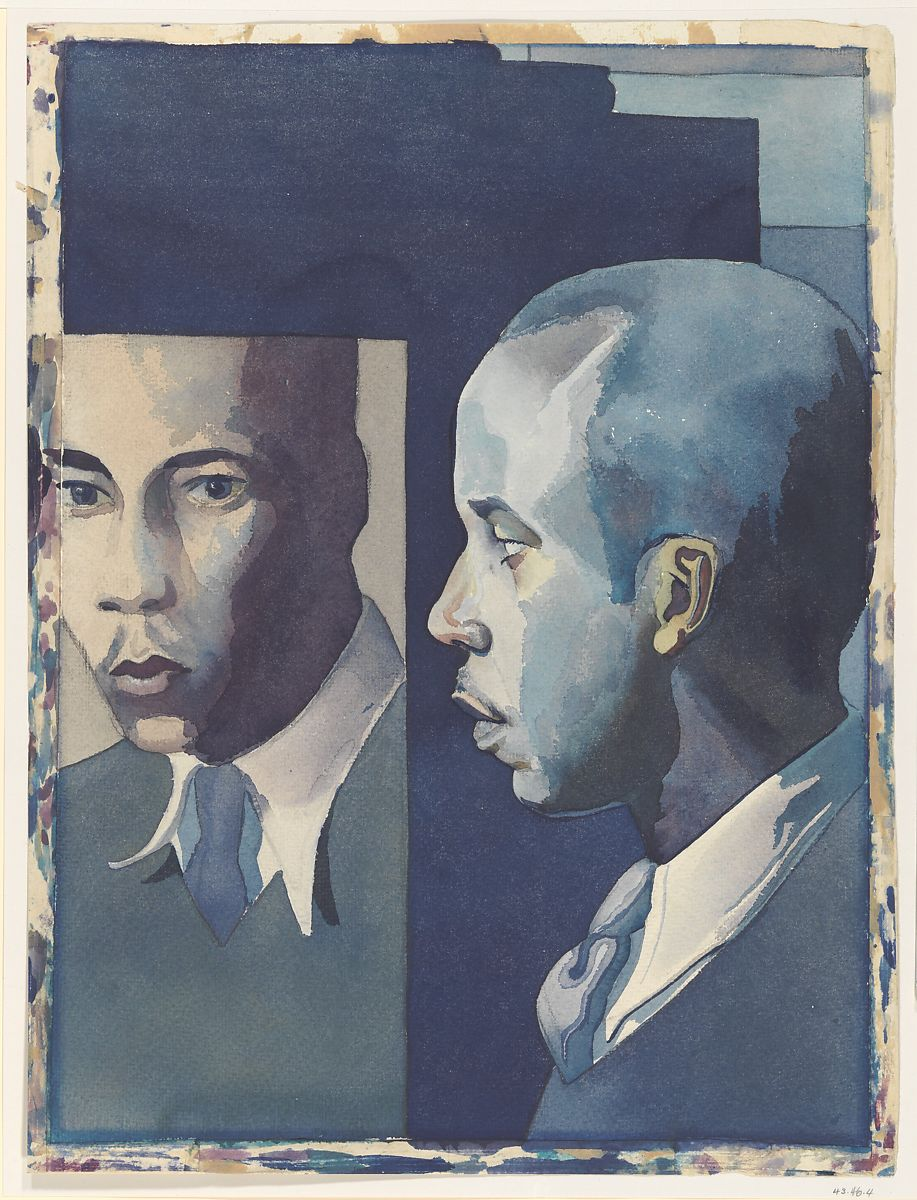
- Self-Portrait by Samuel Joseph Brown Jr.
- Born: 1907; Wilmington, North Carolina, U.S.
- Died: 1994 (aged 86–87); Philadelphia, Pennsylvania, U.S.
- Resting place: Eden Cemetery, Collingdale, PA
- Education: Pennsylvania Museum and School of Industrial Art; University of Pennsylvania

Samuel Joseph Brown Jr. (1907–1994) was a watercolorist, printmaker, and educator. He was the first African-American artist hired to produce work for the Public Works of Art Project, a precursor to the Work Progress Administration's Federal Art Project. Brown often depicted the lives of African Americans in his paintings. He worked primarily in watercolor and oils, and he produced portraits, landscapes and prints.

His paintings are held in the permanent collections of the Philadelphia Museum of Art, the National Gallery of Art, and the Museum of Modern Art.

== Early life and education ==
Brown was born in Wilmington, North Carolina, and moved with his family to Philadelphia in 1917. His father was a mattress-maker and upholsterer and his mother, a seamstress.

He attended James Logan Elementary School where in fourth grade, he won his first art prize. He attended South Philadelphia High School and worked after school for S. Cohen and Sons, a local silkscreen printer.

Brown graduated from high school in 1926 and enrolled at the Pennsylvania Museum and School of Industrial Art (now the University of the Arts) for four years. He graduated in 1930 specializing in art education. Brown received a Master of Fine Arts equivalent degree from the University of Pennsylvania.

== Art career ==
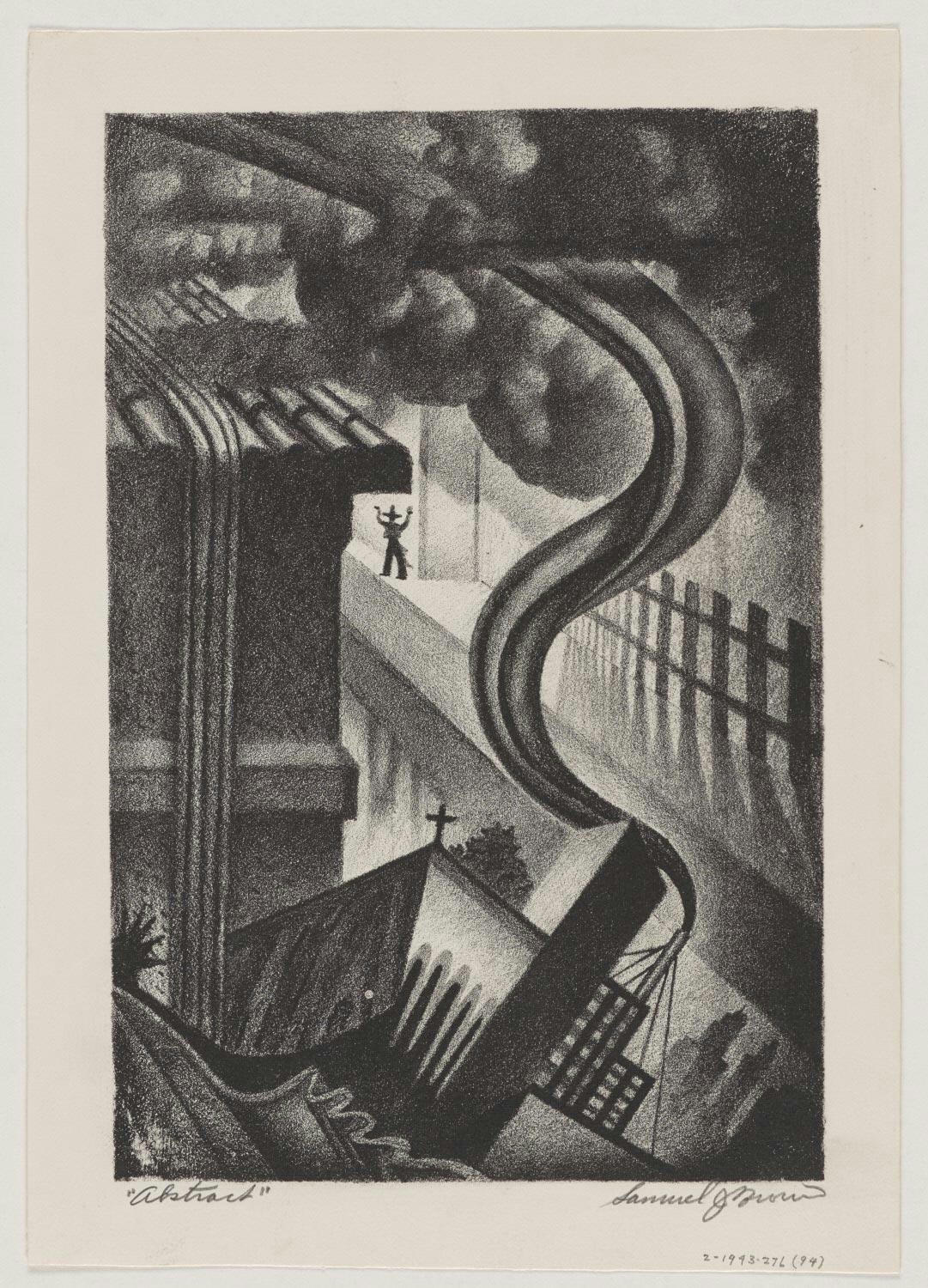
Abstract by Samuel Joseph Brown, Jr. 1937. Published by Works Progress Administration (WPA), Federal Art Project, Philadelphia, 1935 - 1943

=== Early work ===
Brown befriended artist, Dox Thrash, after Thrash arrived in Philadelphia in the late 1920s. The two shared a studio in the 1920s to 1950s, and operated a sign-painting business together in the mid-30s. It was one of several jobs Brown worked over the years to sustain his family.

In 1933, he drew the cover image for the NAACP's The Crisis magazine. The drawing was titled The Problem.

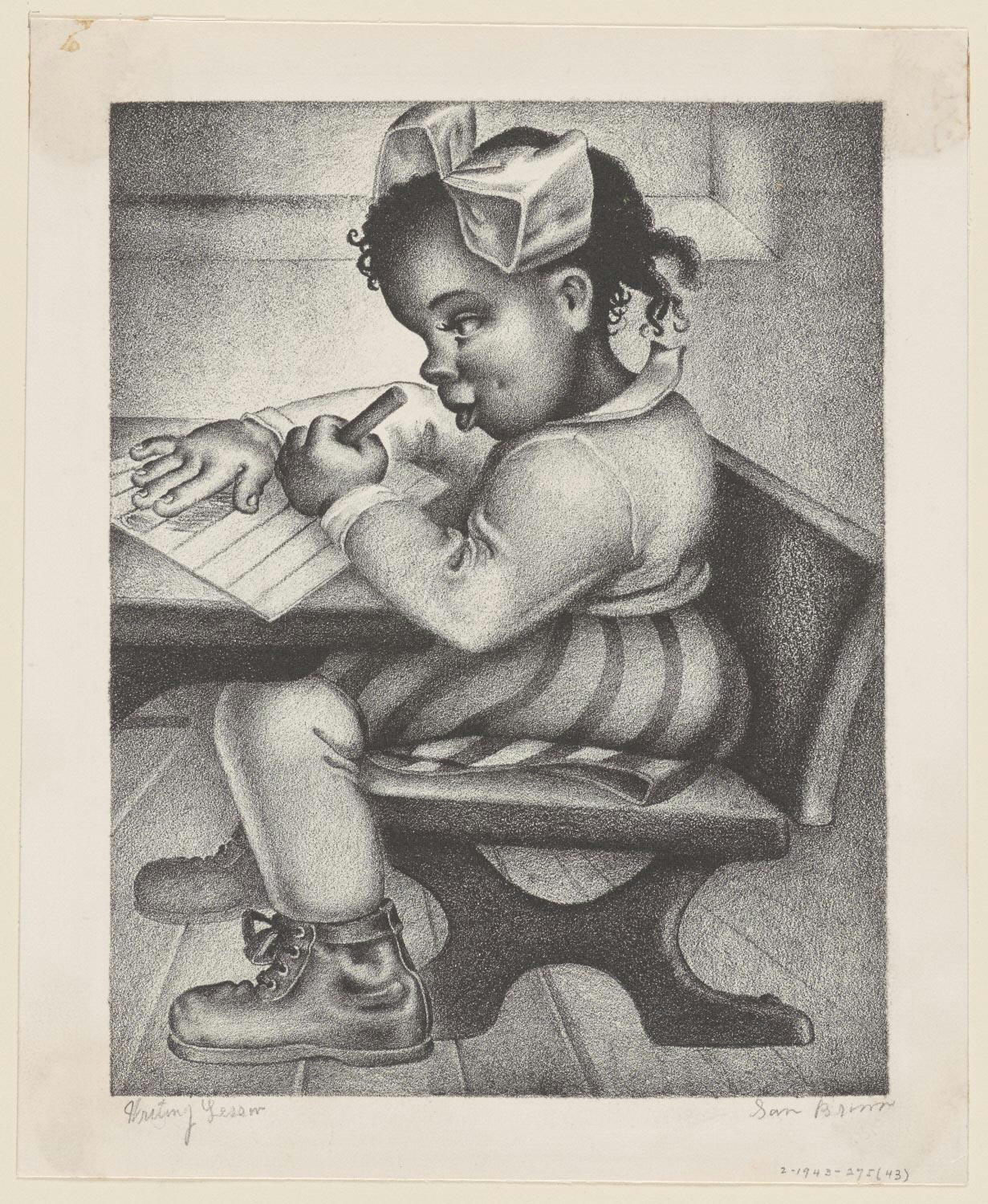
Writing Lesson by Samuel Joseph Brown, Jr. 1938. Published by Works Progress Administration (WPA), Federal Art Project, Philadelphia, 1935 - 1943

=== Federal Art Project ===
In 1933, Fiske Kimball, director of the Philadelphia Museum of Art, appointed Brown to the Public Works of Art Project (PWAP), the first federal employment program for artists. Kimball was in charge of the project in Philadelphia. Brown was the first African-American artist selected for the program. He produced mostly watercolors.

When the Works Progress Administration’s Federal Art Project (FAP) was formed in 1935, Brown began working with the Philadelphia FAP as a painter in the Easel Division and printmaker at its Fine Print Workshop. He remained there until 1938 before becoming a full-time public school teacher.

Brown spent most of his time in the easel-painting and watercolor department but did learn printmaking, producing such works as The Writing Lesson and Abstract.

Brown was employed as a public-school art teacher while simultaneously producing art for the FAP. He worked as a substitute art teacher in Camden, New Jersey in the early 1930s and began his career as a full-time art teacher for the School District of Philadelphia in 1938.

=== 1930s ===
The decade of the 1930s was very productive for Brown. He completed many paintings while employed by the FAP and won high praise for his works at major competitive exhibitions. He caught the attention of the art world and public with two of his FAP paintings and was cited as one of its outstanding artists. Brown and other Philadelphia artists held jobs in WPA workshops and exhibited around the country in its traveling exhibits.

In 1933, Brown exhibited two pieces in the Harmon Foundation competition. A year later, he showed four of his works in a regional PWAP exhibit sponsored by the Philadelphia Museum of Art. Included were The Lynching, Smoking My Pipe and two mural panels of Black babies and kindergarten children.

The Philadelphia Tribune published a photo of The Lynching along with an article that stated, "Years ago, the most daring paint dabbler would not have dared offer the striking conception of a lynching". The article also called the work "one of the unusual paintings" in the PWAP exhibit and stated that "Brown is vitally an individual painter, who, despite his training for commercial design at the School of Industrial Art, breaks through conventions."

The Lynching was among the works in an NAACP-sponsored exhibit titled An Art Commentary on Lynching at the Arthur U. Newton Galleries in New York in 1935. Brown used a style “bordering on caricature. … His clever adoption of a folk-like style to present a serious subject became the mark of his artistic work.” The work had been rejected by the Pennsylvania Academy of the Fine Arts for its annual exhibition that year. “It is one of the most shocking pieces of stark realism ever perpetrated,” noted an article in the Philadelphia Inquirer.

The exhibit had been scheduled for another New York gallery but it pulled out because of “political social and economic pressure”.

Some of Brown’s paintings, including The Lynching and the self-portrait Smoking My Pipe, were chosen for long-term loan to the Philadelphia Art Museum. At the time, Brown was the only WPA artist from whom the museum selected more than one painting. Kimball noted the museum’s deliberations in a letter, stating:

“They took a self-portrait Smoking My Pipe by Brown. Then they reached a picture of striking and delightful fantasy, and said we must have that one too. Later they came to his remarkably imaginative picture, The Lynching, looking down vertically on the victim from the tree, with the little people below. I said you have already taken two by Brown. They said we can’t help it we’ve got to have this one also. He was the only man from whom they took more than one.”

Brown was among more than 500 artists selected for a 1934 national exhibit of PWAP artists at the Corcoran Gallery of Art in Washington, DC. His entry was titled So Tired, a watercolor of an African-American scrubwoman. According to historian James A. Porter,

"Many judged the work shockingly amateurish and extremely grotesque. Others, including the exhibition officials and Mrs. Eleanor Roosevelt, singled it out for special and favorable comment ... The artist, far from considering his use of exaggeration and emphasis inappropriate, declared that his eye would not permit him to depart from the normal except when compelled! Brown uses distortion as a naturalistic device to evoke the feeling of pain, anguish, suffering or struggle”.

First Lady Eleanor Roosevelt recalled viewing So Tired in her syndicated “My Day” newspaper column a decade later on April 8, 1946, giving it her own title of The Scrub Woman.

The painting – a photo of which appeared in Alain Locke’s The Negro in Art in 1940 – disappeared. Brown recreated it in 1982 with the title Scrubwoman II, which was shown in a solo retrospective at the Balch Institute for Ethnic Studies in Philadelphia. Six other works were included in Locke's book, all courtesy of the FAP: Little Boy Blue (1937), Mrs. Simmons (1936), The Writing Lesson (1937), Two Smart Girls (1938), Moments of Thought (1938), Child With Toy Horn (1939).

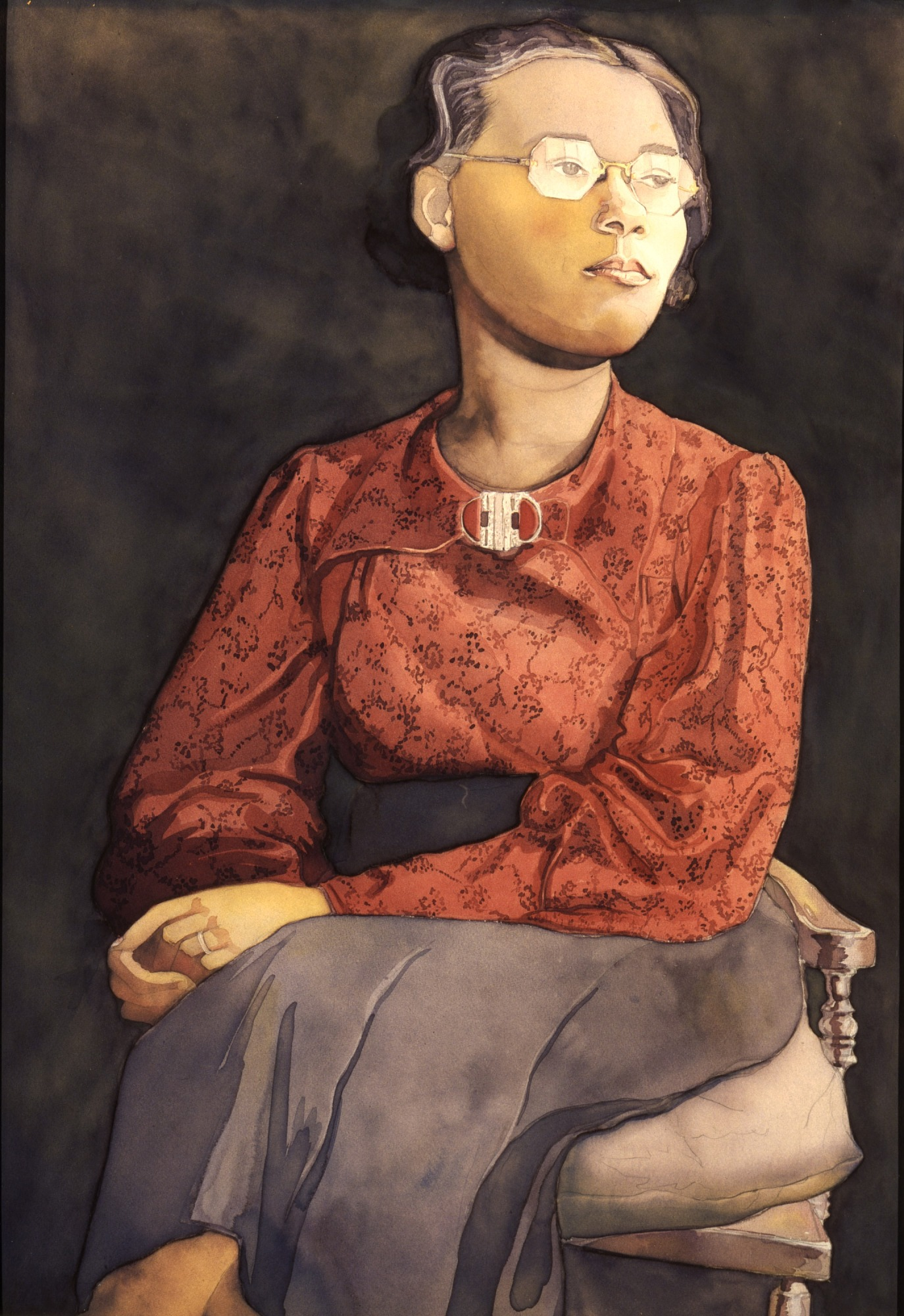
Samuel Joseph Brown Jr.'s Mrs. Simmons, painted in 1936.

In 1936, Brown was one of four African American artists in the New Horizons in American Art exhibit sponsored by the Museum of Modern Art and the FAP. Brown’s Mrs. Simmons was prominently displayed and drew the most attention. He had two other works in the exhibit: Child Prodigy and The Writing Lesson.

In 1937, he was among 12 artists in the exhibit Posters and Prints: WPA Federal Art Project, Pennsylvania sponsored by the Chester County Art Association and School Board of West Chester.

He was one of only two Black artists whose works were selected for the Three Centuries of American Art exhibition in Paris in 1938. Mrs. Simmons was featured in the exhibition.

At the same time, he was exhibiting two watercolors – Flowers and The Plaid Dress – in Negro Hall at the Texas Centennial Exposition in Dallas. In 1939, he participated in a group show titled Contemporary Negro Art at the Baltimore Museum of Art.

Brown was selected to present works at the December 1940 opening of the South Side Community Art Center in Chicago where Roosevelt was the guest speaker.

=== 1940s through 1970s ===
During the summer of 1945, Brown visited Mexico as part of a good will tour with other Philadelphians. That winter, he exhibited many of the works from the trip in a solo show at the Philadelphia Art Alliance. Some were also exhibited a 1946 solo exhibition at the Barnett-Aden Gallery in Washington, DC. His painting Impressions of Mexico was also in an exhibit at the Balch that year.

In May 1945, he showed 30 oils and watercolors at William Penn High School.

While teaching at Dobbins High School in 1946, Brown produced a series of serigraph posters on global peace and brotherhood. Roosevelt purchased a set and donated it to Hyde Park Elementary School in New York. The series titled One World, Brown said, was “the realization of an artist’s dream for the glorification of the Negro child, and the fostering of good will through portraying children of all races in scenes encouraging to correct behavior patterns. Each Poster is the result of hours of thoughtful study, and each has been rendered as a fine art gem. They stand in their simplicity, a beautiful tribute to our children.”

In 1953, he won third place in the professional division of the Latham Foundation’s International Humane Poster Contest. In Latham’s competition in 1962, he won a second prize in the same category out of 31,000 submissions.

During the 1960s, Brown exhibited in local venues, including the John Wanamaker Store Gallery. He participated in a 1969 exhibit at a professional fine arts show at Philadelphia’s Municipal Services Building sponsored by the National Forum of Professional Artists, where he was cited as “the patriarch of living Philadelphia Negro painters” by the art editor of the Philadelphia Evening Bulletin. He participated in its shows for three years in Philadelphia and New York in the early 1970s.

== Later years ==
After retiring from teaching in 1971, Brown continued to paint, and ventured into sculpture and jewelry-making. He also produced portraits of school administrators, prominent Philadelphians, family, friends and religious leaders.

In 1986, the Brandywine Workshop and others created a scholarship in his name at the University of the Arts.

Brown was one of three graduates of the Philadelphia College of Art, formerly the School of Industrial Art and later the University of the Arts, to be featured in the school's 1973 alumni exhibit.

Also in 1973, Smoking My Pipe was in a group exhibit of artwork in possession of the Philadelphia Museum of Art. In 1980, his works were part of a group show at the Afro-American Historical and Cultural Museum, now the African American Museum in Philadelphia, and in 1989, a traveling show of works from the Brandywine Workshop organized by the Smithsonian. It included a self-portrait from 1985 that showed an older Brown. It is in the collection of the Woodmere Art Museum in Philadelphia.

In 1990, Brown was represented in the show “Against the Odds: African American Artists and the Harmon Foundation” at the Newark Art Museum in New Jersey.

In 2015, a Brown watercolor The Odd Sister (1973) was part of a group show at the Woodmere Art Museum titled “We Speak: Black Artists in Philadelphia, 1920s-1970s.” The painting had been shown in 1975 at the Second World Black and African Festival of Art and Culture (FESTAC) at the University of Pennsylvania Museum of Archaeology and Anthropology. Brown was the regional general chairman of FESTAC from 1973-1975.

In 2021, his painting Urlene, Age Nine was featured in the Delaware Art Museum's exhibition, Afro-American Images 1971: The Vision of Percy Ricks.

== Affiliations ==
Brown was a member Tra Club, an organization of Black artists initially formed in 1921. He was president of the club in 1932 when it had 11 members. Brown showed his work at the club's annual art exhibitions.

Brown was an early member of the Pyramid Club, an organization of Black male professionals founded in 1937. Brown participated in the club's annual art exhibitions, along with Henry B. Jones, Howard N. Watson, Benjamin Britt, Robert Jefferson, Samuel J. Brown Jr. and Dox Thrash.

== Exhibitions ==
=== Group ===
- Philadelphia Museum of Art: 1934, 1973
- Public Works of Art Project artist exhibition, Corcoran Gallery of Art: 1934
- An Art Commentary on Lynching, Arthur U. Newton Galleries: 1935.
- Harmon Foundation
- Howard University: 1935 and 1940
- University of Pennsylvania: 1936, 1975
- Federal Art Project exhibition, New Horizons in American Art exhibit, Museum of Modern Art and the FAP: 1936
- Pennsylvania Museum and School of Industrial Art: 1930, 1934 and 1937
- Museum of Modern Art: 1937
- MOMA's Three Centuries of American Art, Paris: 1938.
- Texas Centennial Exposition: 1938.
- Contemporary Negro Art at the Baltimore Museum of Art: 1939
- National Forum of Professional Artists, Philadelphia’s Municipal Services Building: 1969
- Philadelphia College of Art: 1973
- African American Museum of Philadelphia: 1980
- Brandywine Workshop: 1989
- Pennsylvania Academy of the Fine Arts, 2014
- Against the Odds: African American Artists and the Harmon Foundation at the Newark Art Museum: 1990.
- Woodmere Art Museum: 2015
- Afro-American Images 1971: The Vision of Percy Ricks, Delaware Art Museum

=== Solo ===
- Philadelphia Art Alliance: 1945
- Barnett-Aden Gallery: 1946
- Balch Institute for Ethnic Studies in Philadelphia: 1983

== Collections ==
His works are in the collections of the White House, the National Gallery of Art, the Smithsonian American Art Museum, the Corcoran Gallery of Art, the Philadelphia Museum of Art, the University of Pennsylvania, Woodmere Art Museum, Howard University, the Baltimore Museum of Art, the Museum of Modern Art, the Metropolitan Museum of Art, the Pennsylvania Academy of the Fine Arts, the Philadelphia School District, the Franklin D. Roosevelt Presidential Library and Museum and the Williams College Museum of Art. Brown's 1985 self-portrait print from the Brandywine Workshop and five from the Federal Art Project are in the Print and Picture Collection at the Free Library of Philadelphia.

== Teaching career ==
Brown was a substitute art teacher in Camden, New Jersey public schools in the early 1930s. In 1938, he was one of ten Black teachers assigned to white schools in the Philadelphia School District, becoming a commercial art teacher at Bok Vocational High School. He worked at Vaux Junior High School followed by Dobbins Vocational-Technical High School, where he taught for 25 years. Brown retired in 1971 after 33 years of teaching in the public school system.

== Personal life ==
Brown married Miriam Lois Ellison in 1938 after they met at a church social that she had organized. She was an elementary school teacher for 30 years. Born in Palatka, Florida, she moved with her family to Philadelphia at the age of 7 when her father received a pastorship at a West Philadelphia church. They had three children; their daughter Urlene died of leukemia at age 25 in the mid-1970s. She was the subject of his 1956 painting Urlene, Age Nine.
