= Dox Thrash =

African American artist (1893–1965)

- Born: March 22, 1893; Griffin, Georgia, U.S.
- Died: April 19, 1965 (aged 72); Philadelphia, Pennsylvania, U.S.
- Known for: printmaker, painter

Dox Thrash (1893–1965) was an African-American artist who was famed as a skilled draftsman, master printmaker, and painter and as the co-inventor of the Carborundum printmaking process. The subject of his artwork was African American life. He served as a printmaker with the W.P.A. at the Fine Print Workshop of Philadelphia. The artist spent much of his career living and working in Philadelphia, Pennsylvania.

== Early life ==
Dox Thrash was born on March 22, 1893, in Griffin, Georgia. He was the second of four children in his family. Thrash left home at the age of fifteen in search of work up north. He was part of the Great Migration (African American) looking for industrial work in the North.

The first job that Thrash got was working with a circus and a Vaudeville act. In 1911, at the age of 18, he moved to Chicago, Illinois. He got a job as an elevator operator during the day, and used this source of income to attend school. In 1914 he attended the School of the Art Institute of Chicago.

In 1917, the United States declared war on Germany and entered World War I. In September 1917, at the age of twenty-four, Thrash enlisted in the army. He was placed in the 365th Infantry Regiment, 183rd Brigade, 92nd Division, also known as the Buffalo Soldiers. During combat, Thrash suffered shell shock and a gas attack, but was not permanently injured.

== Career as an artist ==
Front cover of Dox Thrash: An African American Master Printmaker Rediscovered, by John Ittmann.

After having served in the war, Thrash qualified as a war veteran and enrolled in the Art Institute of Chicago with the support of federal funding. After finishing his education, he traveled intermittently from Georgia to Chicago, Boston, New York, and finally Philadelphia, working odd jobs - experiences that provided him with subject matter to later paint. Settling in Philadelphia by 1925, he took a job working as a janitor. In his free time, he continued his art career and used his talent to create emblems, such as the one for the North Philadelphia Businessmen's Association, and posters in exhibitions and festivals, including the 2nd Annual National Negro Music Festival and the Tra Club of Philadelphia. This gained him local recognition and opened doors for new artistic endeavors. By 1929, Thrash was attending nightly classes within these clubs, namely with Earl Horter of the Graphic Sketch Club, now known as the Samuel S. Fleisher Art Memorial.

In 1937 Thrash joined the government-sponsored Works Progress Administration (WPA)'s Federal Art Project. Through the WPA, Thrash began working at the Fine Print Workshop of Philadelphia. At the Fine Print Workshop of Philadelphia, Thrash, along with Michael J. Gallagher and Hugh Mesibov, began experimenting and co-inventing the process of carborundum mezzotint, a printmaking technique. Carborundum printmaking uses a carbon-based abrasive to burnish copper plates creating an image that can produce a print in tones ranging from pale gray to deep black. The method is similar to the more difficult and complicated mezzotint process developed in the 17th century. He used this as his primary medium for much of his career and created his greatest works with it. One of his first pieces employing this nascent technique was his anonymous self-portrait entitled Mr. X.

With this new technique, the three gained increasing recognition as they published more and more graphics within newspapers and featured more and more pieces within exhibitions. Their works often featured subtle commentaries about social and economic exploitation regarding the contemporary politics of the Great Depression and the Second World War. By 1940, Thrash, Gallagher, and Mesibov all began to gain attention in local circles for their carborundum prints, although the role that each artist played in the development of the process was left unclear.

In 1960, Thrash participated in a show at the Pyramid Club, a social organization of Black professional men that held an annual art exhibit starting in 1941. Others on hand were Howard N. Watson, Benjamin Britt, Robert Jefferson and Samuel J. Brown Jr.

Thrash spent the later years of his life mentoring young African American artists. He died on April 19, 1965, in Philadelphia, Pennsylvania. He was posthumously honored almost 40 years later in 2001 with a major retrospective, titled Dox Thrash: An African-American Master Printmaker Rediscovered, at the Philadelphia Museum of Art.

Thrash's work was included in the 2015 exhibition We Speak: Black Artists in Philadelphia, 1920s-1970s at the Woodmere Art Museum.

In late-2020, after years of activism by preservationists, it was announced that Thrash's North Philadelphia house would be converted from a vacant property into a community resource.

== Relation to Alain Locke and the New Negro Movement ==
Alain LeRoy Locke (1885–1954) was an intellectual, professor and author who espoused that African Americans, specifically artists, to capture the personality, lives, and essence of their people in The New Negro. He explained “The Negro physiognomy must be freshly and objectively conceived on its own patterns if it is ever to be seriously and importantly interpreted. Art must discover and reveal the beauty which prejudice and caricature have overlaid.” What Locke is expressing here is not only the call for black artists to overcome racial prejudices via positive artistic representations of blacks, but that the actual African American individual like Thrash portrayed the lives of fellow blacks, and had the power to propagate this idea of the New Negro, as Locke explains, “There is the possibility that the sensitive artistic mind of the American Negro, stimulated by a cultural pride and interest, will receive…a profound and galvanizing influence.”

In his carborundum mezzotint Cabin Days, Thrash depicts a southern black family on the porch of their shack-like home in a rural landscape. The man, woman, and child, clutched tenderly to the female figure's breast, create an intimate scene highlighted by the bright cleanliness of the laundry hanging behind them. Placed in front of the drying laundry, they are framed by one aspect of the hard work accomplished during the day. Close to one another, staring collectively outward at the Southern landscape, they, and their laudable priorities of cleanliness and family, are made the bright focal point in the poor, unstable atmosphere. Such inner warmth is seemingly incompatible with the family's crooked and disheveled surroundings, and their fuzzy appearance with a lack of facial detail makes the scene into a general archetype for rural southern blacks living conditions and qualities. Thrash was referencing an experience common to thousands of black families in rural occupations at the turn of the 20th century, often forced into slavery-like tenant farming as their only means of livelihood in the racist South. The “uneven clapboards, leaning porch, broken shutter, and uprooted fence” are rife with instability, much like the post-slavery economic and social systems of the South, making it clear that for African Americans, “the house is not the home; rather, the figures on the porch represent family unity and continuity”. In this way, Thrash is able to not only champion the positive qualities of blacks in the family setting but underscore this with a symbolic look at their disadvantaged situation, making it all the more impressive that they persevere. Thrash symbolically depicted harsh realities for the African American at this transitional point in history while conferring a sensitive rendering of their humanity, akin to any other race, despite its utter denial by American society.

In fact it was the strength of his fellow African Americans that Thrash often emphasized, amongst other positive characteristics in the face of adversity in personal portraits. Through his carborundum print Life, he depicts a neatly dressed black girl reading what appears to be a newspaper or magazine. The subject stares intently at her material, fixated on the abundance of text. Art historian Richard Powell describes it best, stating that Life's “non-racial genre scene, soft sells that Black children, too, experience the thrills and tender moments of youth. These underlying themes of commonalities and unity contribute to an aesthetic of being part of a larger system as opposed to being separate from it.” Thrash's conscious decision to not only give specific attention to a black subject through a portrait, but to place the child as engaging in an intellectual pursuit that crosses racial borders enforces a positive view of African Americans as intelligent, integral members of society akin to whites. The lighting of the print adds to this effect as well. The room in which the girl sits is dark and shadowy, however, the light source shines directly upon her face and lap, emphasizing her beautifully carved young features engrossed in the reading material. In addition, her social status is touched upon by her clean, well-tailored, and fashionable dress of the day. Her literacy is therefore inextricably interwoven with her personal and familial success. She is the antithesis to Locke's idea of the caricature of blacks whose poses and exaggerated features were made to dehumanize and convey a diminished sense of intelligence and capability.

Thrash also acknowledged common cultural clashes and challenges faced by African Americans through his portraiture as well. In his etching Saturday Night, he depicts a female hairdresser readying herself for a night on the town. Her facial features and coloring distinctly label her as African American, and it is the act she is engaging in that is of utmost importance. The woman is straightening her naturally curly hair with a hot iron. She is conforming to physical standards foisted upon her by the dominant white society where straight hair is a marker of beauty. Though muscular, shapely, and attractive, she feels the need to engage in the laborious task of making her tightly coiled hair straight in order to prepare for the night in the public sphere. In fact, weariness at the task is written all over her face, the scratchy lines of the etching giving heavy shadow to the area underneath her eyes and the lines touching from her nostrils till the outsides of her lips. This technique of etching lends a weariness or faded quality to the entire piece, the woman and her world appearing to be worn down to a mere skeleton of their realities. Her left leg casually draped across her right and the ease with which she appears to hold the straightening tool signify the routine quality of this preparation, despite her apparent dissatisfaction at the procedure. Throughout all of this, she directly confronts the viewer with a strong gaze, as if the audience is her mirror. It is as if Thrash was literally reflecting his African American audience back at themselves, hinting at the psychological expense of attempting to conform to pre-existing white norms. Such an activity, though on the surface merely a shallow process of beautification, carries with it the idea of rejecting your natural physical state, or rather one's blackness. To Locke and Thrash, this was not viewed as positive for African Americans considering that it the connotation of such an act of conforming to the aesthetic norms of white society puts the natural condition of blacks in a categorization of less than optimal, or ugly. Such a sentiment does not produce pride for the community or bolster the idea of the New Negro. However, Thrash's acknowledgement of the common practice, reflecting it back to the community, is a step towards progressing towards a more positive, independent state.

== Relation to W. E. B. Du Bois ==
In an editorial in the monthly magazine The Crisis, W. E. B. Du Bois, another father of “The New Negro Movement,” said “let us train ourselves to see beauty in black”. Dubois called upon African-Americans to be proud of their heritage instead of being ashamed of their dark skin. This racial image issue was another characteristic of the African-American experience at this time. Thrash addressed the issue by creating portraits of African-American subjects and ideal heads using his carborundum mezzotint method that defined typically black facial features in a more realistic manner. At a time when white artists illustrated blacks barbarically in cartoons and newspapers, tasteful portrayals of black subjects were highly influential.

In Thrash's illustration of an African-American woman in his print Marylou, the chiaroscuro effect is extreme. Unlike some of his prints, there is minimal, visible white space in this print, except for around the subject's head. Resembling a halo, the light space bordering the woman's head gives the viewer a sense that there is something pure and righteous about her. She is not tainted or inferior as white society might try to imply. This could be Thrash's attempt to see the beauty in black as W. E. B. Du Bois called upon African-Americans to do in his editorial. Although this painting focuses on an individual, the way that the woman's eyes are illustrated makes her seem as though she is not a specific individual. Her extremely darkened eyes prevent the reader from identifying a precise woman, which enables the viewer to accept her as a symbol of the beauty of all African-American women.

== See also ==
- Samuel Joseph Brown Jr.
