= List of African-American artists =

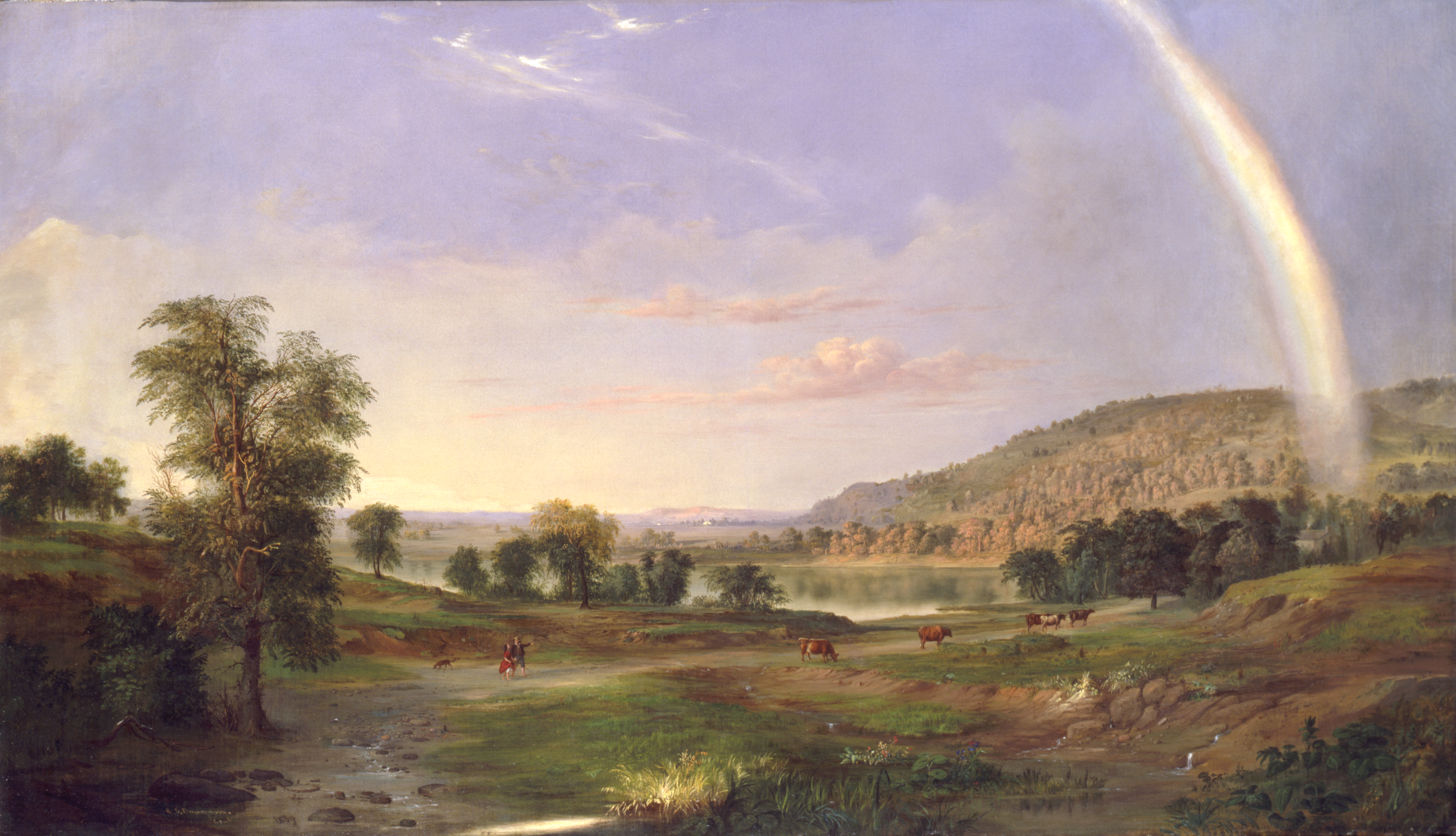
Robert Scott Duncanson, Landscape with Rainbow c. 1859, Hudson River School, Smithsonian American Art Museum, Washington, DC.

This list of African-American artists is a list that includes dates of birth and death of historically recognized African-American artists known for the creation of artworks that are primarily visual in nature, including traditional media such as painting, sculpture, photography, and printmaking, as well as more recent genres, including installation art, performance art, body art, conceptual art, video art, and digital art. The entries are in alphabetical order by surname.

== Artists ==
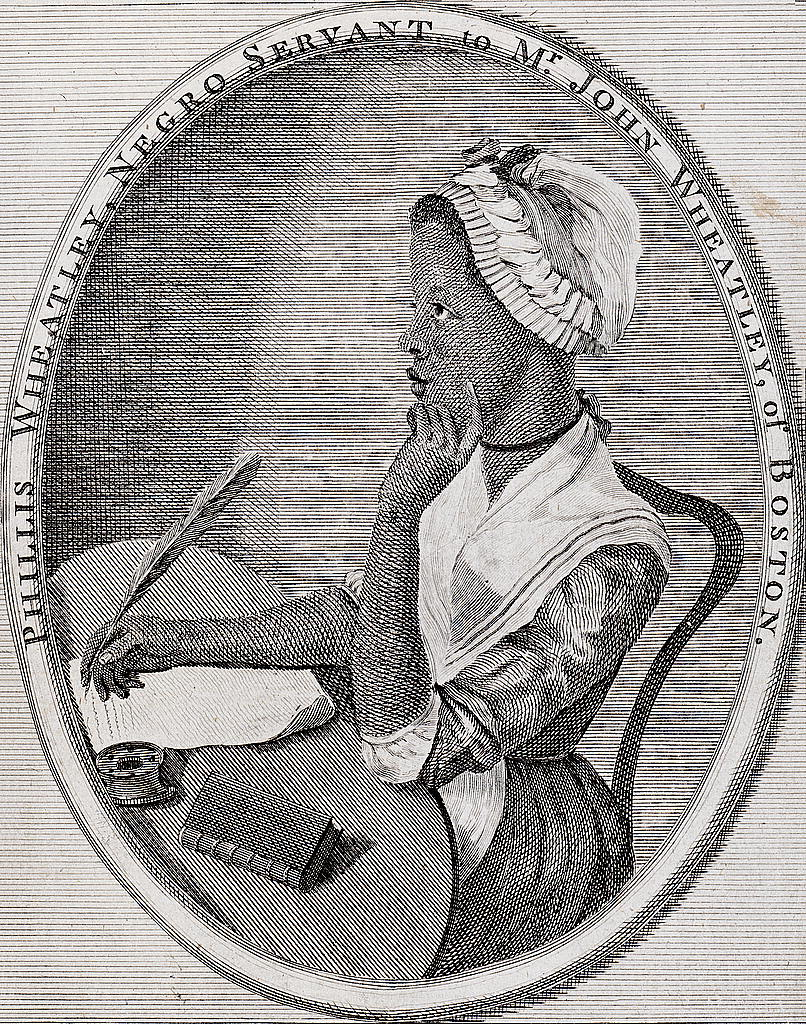
Scipio Moorhead, Portrait of poet Phillis Wheatley, 1773, in the frontispiece to her book Poems on Various Subjects

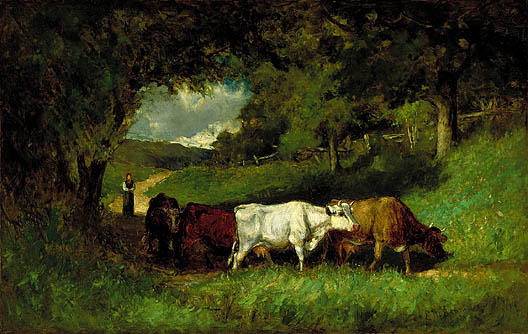
Edward Mitchell Bannister, Driving Home the Cows 1881

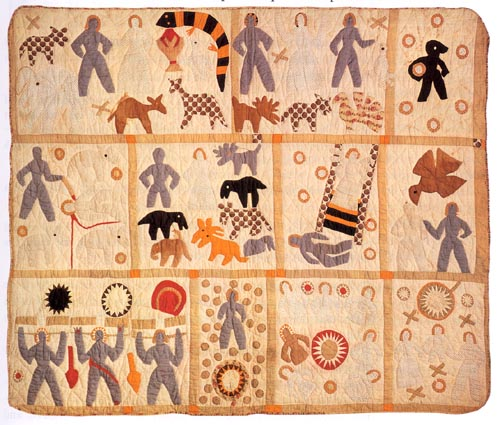
Harriet Powers, Bible quilt, mixed media, 1886

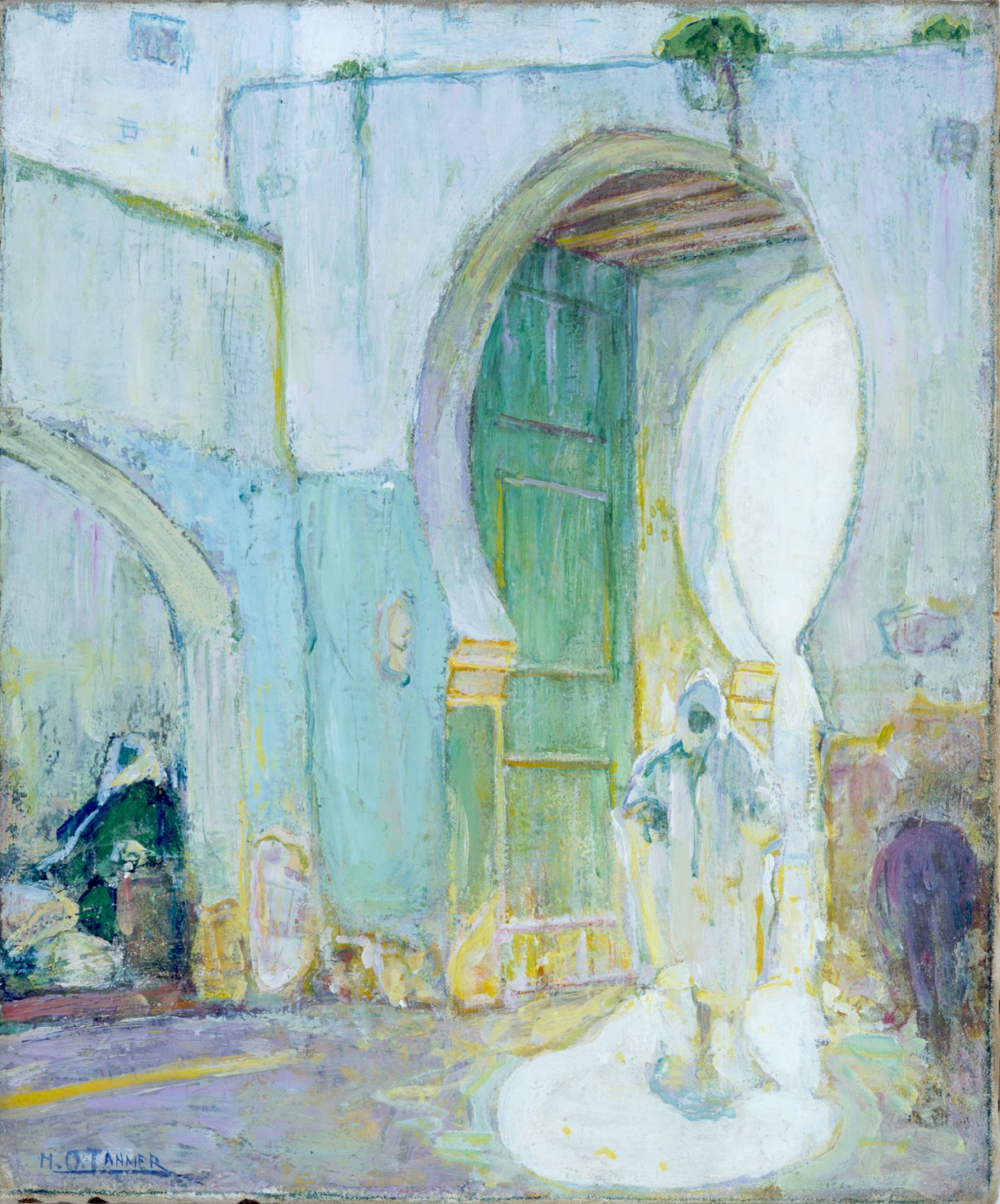
Henry Ossawa Tanner, Gateway, Tangier, 1912, oil on canvas, 18 7/16" × 15 5/16", St. Louis Art Museum

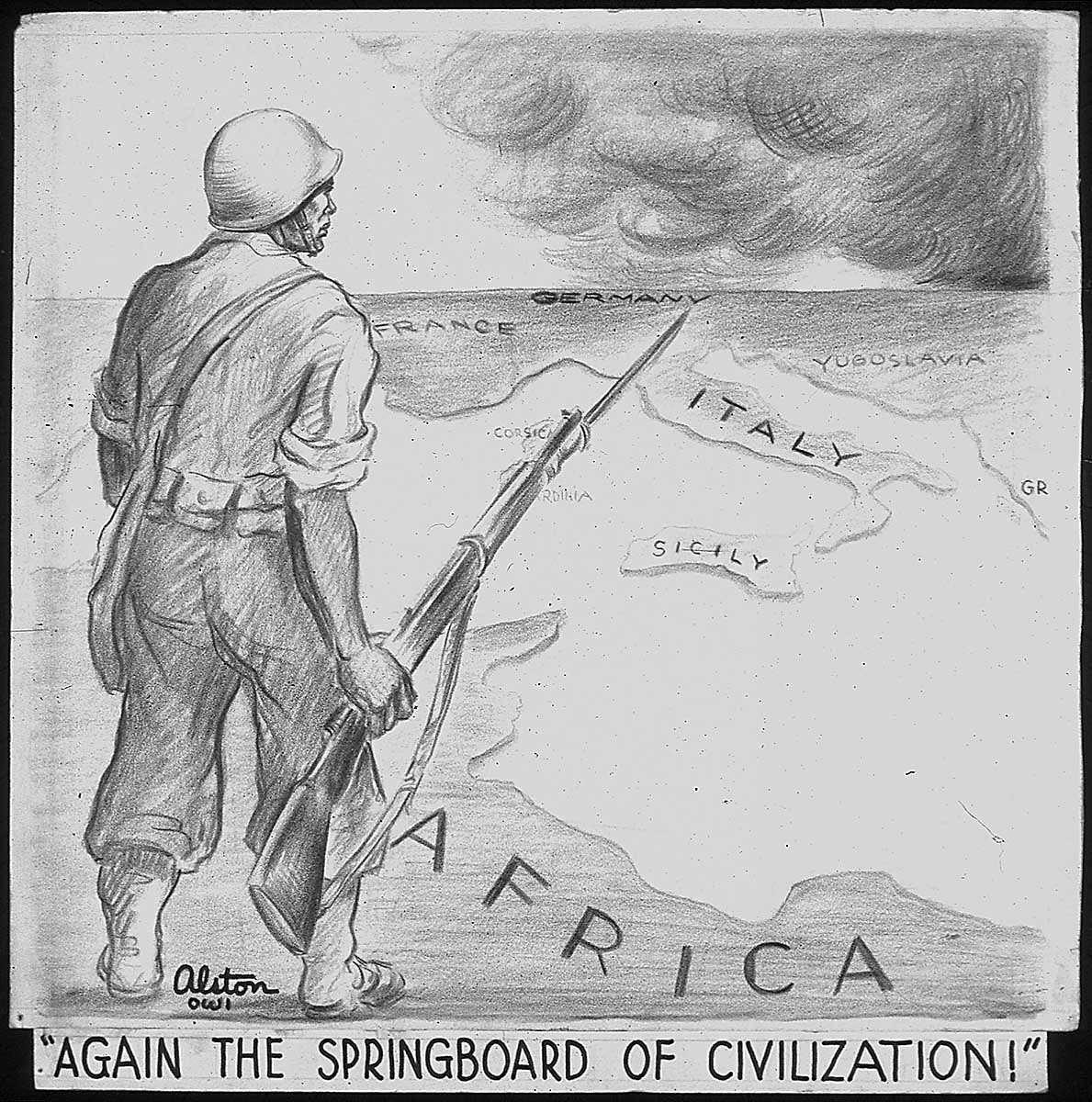
Charles Alston, Again The Springboard Of Civilization, 1943 (WWII African American soldier)

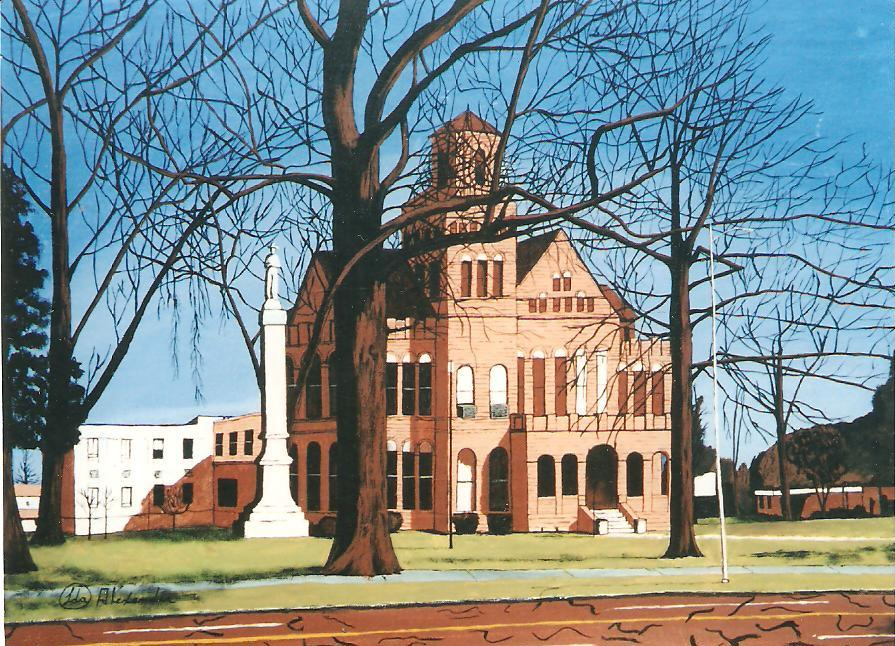
Larry D. Alexander,Greenville Courthouse, 1998

=== A–B ===
- Panteha Abareshi (born 1999), multidisciplinary artist
- Nina Chanel Abney (born 1982), painter
- Blanch Ackers (1914–2003), painter
- Terry Adkins (1953–2014), artist
- Mequitta Ahuja (born 1976), painter, installation artist
- Larry D. Alexander (born 1953), painter
- Laylah Ali (born 1968), painter
- Jules T. Allen (born 1947), photographer
- Tina Allen (1949–2008), sculptor
- Steve R. Allen (born 1954), painter
- Charles Alston (1907–1977), painter
- Amalia Amaki (born 1959), artist
- Emma Amos (1938–2020), painter
- Benny Andrews (1930–2006), painter
- Edgar Arceneaux (born 1972), drawing artist
- Nellie Ashford (born c. 1943), folk artist
- James Atkins (born 1941), painter
- Ellsworth Augustus Ausby (1942–2011), painter, sculptor, performance artist
- Roland Ayers (1932–2014), printmaker
- Radcliffe Bailey (born 1968), collage, sculpture
- Kyle Baker (born 1965), cartoonist
- Matt Baker (1921–1959), comic book artist
- Rushern Baker IV (born 1987), painter
- James Presley Ball (1825–1904), photographer
- Alvin Baltrop (1948–2004), photographer
- Henry Bannarn (1910–1965), painter
- Edward Mitchell Bannister (1828–1901), painter
- Ernie Barnes (1938–2009), neo-Mannerist artist
- Richmond Barthé (1901–1989), sculptor
- Jean-Michel Basquiat (1960–1988), painter
- C. M. Battey (1873–1927), photographer
- Mary Enoch Elizabeth Baxter (born 1981), multimedia artist and activist
- Romare Bearden (1911–1988), painter
- Alice Beasley (born 1945), quilt artist
- Kevin Beasley (born 1985), sculptor and performance artist
- Arthello Beck (1941–2004), painter
- Arthur P. Bedou (1882–1966), photographer
- Darrin Bell (born 1975), cartoonist
- Mary A. Bell (1873–1941), illustrator
- Dawoud Bey (born 1953), photographer
- Sharif Bey (born 1974), ceramist
- John T. Biggers (1924–2001), muralist
- Sanford Biggers (born 1970), interdisciplinary
- Gene Bilbrew (1923–1974), cartoonist and fetish artist
- Camille Billops (1933–2019), filmmaker, sculptor, painter, printmaker
- McArthur Binion (born 1946), painter
- Robert Blackburn (1920–2003), master printmaker, lithographer, and educator
- Thomas Blackshear (born 1955)
- Betty Blayton (1937–2016), painter, printmaker
- Lula Mae Blocton (born 1947), painter
- Skunder Boghossian (1937–2003)
- Chakaia Booker (born 1953), sculptor
- Edythe Boone (born 1938), muralist
- Charles Boyce (born 1949), cartoonist
- Mark Bradford (born 1961)
- Peter Bradley (born 1940), painter and sculptor
- James Brantley (born 1945), painter
- Tina Williams Brewer, fiber artist
- Moe Brooker (1940–2022), painter, educator and printmaker
- Elenora "Rukiya" Brown (born 1952), doll creator
- Elmer Brown (1909–1971)
- Frank J. Brown (1956–2020), sculptor
- Frederick J. Brown (1945–2012), painter
- Larry Poncho Brown (born 1962)
- Manuelita Brown, sculptor
- Robert Brown (c. 1936 – 2007), cartoonist
- Samuel Joseph Brown (1907–1994), watercolorist, printmaker and educator
- Vivian E. Browne (1929–1993)
- Donna Bruton (1954–2012), collagist, painter, educator
- Beverly Buchanan (1940–2015), painter, sculptor
- Selma Burke (1900–1995), sculptor
- Calvin Burnett (1921–2007), book illustrator
- Pauline Powell Burns (1872–1912), painter
- John Bush (?–1754), powder horn carver
- Bisa Butler (born 1973), quilter
- Robert Butler (1943–2014), painter

=== C–D ===
- Frank Calloway (1915–2014)
- E. Simms Campbell (1906–1971), cartoonist
- Cicely Carew (born 1982), mixed-media artist
- Allen 'Big Al' Carter (1947–2008)
- Fred Carter (1938–2023), cartoonist
- Yvonne Pickering Carter (born 1939)
- Bernie Casey (1939–2017), painter
- Elizabeth Catlett (1915–2012), sculptor and printmaker
- Nick Cave (born 1959), performance artist
- Michael Ray Charles (born 1967), painter
- Barbara Chase-Riboud (born 1936), sculptor
- Jamour Chames (born 1989), painter
- Don Hogan Charles (1938–2017), photographer
- Caitlin Cherry (born 1987), painter and sculptor
- Claude Clark (1915–2001), painter and printmaker
- Edward Clark (1926–2019), painter
- Sonya Clark (born 1967), textile and multimedia artist
- Willie Cole (born 1955), painter
- Robert Colescott (1925–2009), painter
- Bethany Collins (born 1984)
- Houston Conwill (1947–2016), multidisciplinary artist
- Eldzier Cortor (1916–2015), artist and printmaker
- Pamela Council (born 1986), multidisciplinary artist, sculptor
- Adger Cowans (born 1936), fine arts photographer and abstract painter
- Ralston Crawford (1906–1978), abstract painter, lithographer and photographer
- Ernest Crichlow (1914–2005), social realist artist
- Allan Crite (1910–2007), painter
- Njideka Akunyili Crosby (born 1983), painter
- Emilio Cruz (1938–2004), painter
- Frank E. Cummings III (born 1938), woodworker
- Michael Cummings (born 1945), textile artist
- Deborah Dancy (born 1949)
- Ulysses Davis (1913–1990), sculptor
- Bing Davis (born 1937), potter and graphic artist
- Charles C. Dawson (1889–1981), illustrator, painter, and printmaker
- Roy DeCarava (1919–2009), photographer
- Beauford Delaney (1901–1979), painter
- Joseph Delaney (1904–1991)
- Nadine M. DeLawrence (1953–1992), American sculptor and installation artist
- Xiomara De Oliver (born 1967), Canadian-born American painter.
- Woody De Othello (born 1991), ceramicist, painter
- Rosetta DeBerardinis, painter
- Louis Delsarte (1944–2020), artist
- Richard W. Dempsey (1909–1987), illustrator and painter
- Cheryl Derricotte, glass artist, printmaker
- Joseph Clinton Devillis (1878–1912), painter
- Thornton Dial (1928–2016)
- Terry Dixon (born 1969), painter and multimedia artist
- Jeff Donaldson (1932–2004), painter and critic
- Aaron Douglas (1899–1979), painter
- Emory Douglas (born 1943), Black Panther artist
- John E. Dowell Jr. (born 1941), printmaker, etcher, lithographer, and painter
- Leonardo Drew (born 1961)
- David Driskell (1931–2020), artist and scholar
- Robert Seldon Duncanson (1821–1872), Hudson River School
- Edward Dwight (born 1933), sculptor, painter, author
- Torkwase Dyson (born 1973), interdisciplinary artist

=== E–H ===
- Walter Edmonds (1938–2011), muralist
- William Edmondson (1874–1951), folk art sculptor
- Allan L. Edmunds (born 1949), printmaker
- Melvin Edwards (1937–2026), sculptor
- Janiva Ellis (born 1987), painter
- Walter Ellison (1899–1977), painter
- Minnie Evans (1892–1987), folk artist
- Fred Eversley (born 1941), sculptor
- Lola Flash (born 1959), photographer
- Halim Flowers (born 1980), street artist
- LaToya Ruby Frazier (born 1982), photographer
- Meta Vaux Warrick Fuller (1877–1968), artist
- George Gadson (born 1953), artist and sculptor
- Charles Gaines (born 1944), conceptual artist
- Ellen Gallagher (born 1965)
- Reginald Gammon (1921–2005), painter, printmaker, activist
- Melvino Garretti (born 1946)
- Theaster Gates (born 1973), sculptor, ceramicist, and performance artist
- Reginald K (Kevin) Gee (born 1964), painter
- Herbert Gentry (1919–2003), painter
- Wilda Gerideau-Squires (born 1946), photographer
- Ficre Ghebreyesus (1962–2012)
- Robert A. Gilbert (c. 1870 – 1942), nature photographer
- Leah Gilliam (born 1967), media artist and filmmaker
- Sam Gilliam (1933–2022), painter
- Russell T. Gordon (1936–2013), printmaker
- Rex Goreleigh (1902–1986), painter, educator
- Billy Graham (1935–1999), comic book artist
- Lonnie Graham, photographer and installation artist
- Deborah Grant (born 1968), painter
- Todd Gray (born 1954), photographer, installation and performance artist
- Leamon Green (born 1959)
- Renee Green (born 1959), installation artist
- Mario Gully, comic book artist
- Tyree Guyton (born 1955)
- Lauren Halsey (born 1987), installation artist
- Ed Hamilton (born 1947), sculptor
- Patrick Earl Hammie (born 1981), painter
- David Hammons (born 1943), artist
- Trenton Doyle Hancock (born 1974)
- Austin Hansen (1910–1996), photographer
- John Wesley Hardrick (1891–1948), painter
- Edwin Harleston (1882–1931), painter
- Elise Forrest Harleston (1891–1970), photographer
- Jerry Harris (1945–2016), sculptor
- John T. Harris (1908–1972), painter, printmaker, educator
- Kira Lynn Harris (born 1963), multidisciplinary
- Lawrence Harris (born 1937), painter
- Ilana Harris-Babou (born 1991), sculptor and installation artist
- Marren Hassenger (born 1947), sculptor, installation, performance
- Palmer Hayden (1893–1973), painter
- Donté K. Hayes (b. 1975), ceramicist
- Barkley Hendricks (1945–2017), painter
- Nestor Hernández (1961–2006), photographer
- George Herriman (1880–1944), cartoonist
- Felrath Hines (1913–1993), painter, conservator
- LaToya M. Hobbs (born 1988), printmaker, painter, mixed media artist
- Alvin Hollingsworth (1928–2000), illustrator, painter
- Humbert Howard (1905 or 1915–1990), painter, ceramicist
- William Howard (active 19th century), American woodworker and craftsman
- Bryce Hudson (born 1979), painter, sculptor
- Julien Hudson (1811–1844), painter, sculptor
- David Huffman (born 1963), painter
- Edward Ellis Hughes (1940–2017), painter
- Richard Hunt (1935–2023), sculptor
- Clementine Hunter (1886/7–1988), folk artist
- Bill Hutson (1936–2022), abstract fine artist

=== J–O ===
- Oliver Lee Jackson (born 1935), painter, sculptor, printmaker, educator
- Suzanne Jackson (born 1944), artist, gallery owner
- Tomashi Jackson (born 1980), multimedia artist, painter, videographer, textile-maker and sculptor
- Virginia Jaramillo (born 1939)
- Wadsworth Jarrell (born 1929), painter, sculptor
- Steffani Jemison (born 1981), performance artist, video artist
- Wilmer Angier Jennings (1910–1990), printmaker, painter, jeweler
- Annette P. Jimerson (born 1966), painter
- Joshua Johnson (c. 1763 – c. 1824), portrait painter and folk artist
- LeRoy Johnson (1937–1922), multidisciplinary artist
- Malvin Gray Johnson (1896–1934), painter
- Martina Johnson-Allen (born 1947), painter, sculptor, and printmaker, educator
- Rashid Johnson (born 1977), conceptual artist
- Sargent Johnson (1888–1967), sculptor
- William H. Johnson (1902–1970)
- Ben F. Jones (born 1941)
- Calvin B. Jones (1934–2010), painter, muralist
- Ida E. Jones (1874–1959), painter
- Jennie C. Jones (born 1968), multidisciplinary
- Lois Mailou Jones (1905–1998), painter
- Lawrence A. Jones (1910–1996), artist, teacher
- Samuel Levi Jones (born 1978), painter, assemblage artist
- Seitu Jones (born 1951), multidisciplinary, sculptor
- Eddie Jack Jordan (1925–1999), artist, teacher
- Ronald Joseph (1910–1992), artist, teacher, and printmaker
- Titus Kaphar (born 1976), painter
- Richard Gordon Kendall (1933–2008), Texas-based outsider artist
- Autumn Knight (born 1980), interdisciplinary artist working with performance, installation, and text
- Gwendolyn Knight (1914–2005), artist
- Doyle Lane (1923–2002), ceramist
- Claude Lawrence (born 1944), abstract artist
- Jacob Lawrence (1917–2000), painter
- Deana Lawson (born 1979), photographer
- Carolyn Lazard (born 1987), conceptual artist
- Hughie Lee-Smith (1915–1999), artist
- Simone Leigh (born 1967), sculpture, ceramics
- Edmonia Lewis (c. 1843 – 1879), artist
- Nate Lewis (born 1985), visual artist
- Norman Lewis (1909–1979), painter
- Joe Louis Light (1934–2005), painter and sculptor
- Glenn Ligon (born 1960), painter
- James Little (born 1952), painter, curator
- Willie Little (born 1961), multimedia artist, painter, sculptor, author
- Llanakila, artist, painter, digital illustrator, and digital artist
- Tom Lloyd (1929–1996), sculptor, activist and community organizer
- Edward L. Loper, Sr. (1916–2011), painter
- Whitfield Lovell (born 1960), artist
- Alvin D. Loving (1935–2005), artist
- Eric N. Mack (born 1987), painter, multi-media installation artist, and sculptor
- Gwendolyn Ann Magee (1943–2011), artist, quilter
- Clarence Major (born 1936), painter
- Ajuan Mance, visual artist, professor
- Kerry James Marshall (born 1955), painter
- Eugene J. Martin (1938–2005), painter
- Louise Martin (1911–1995), photographer
- Percy Martin, printmaker
- Richard Mayhew (1934–2024), landscape painter
- Valerie Maynard (1937–2022), sculptor, printmaker, painter
- Ealy Mays (born 1959), painter
- Lester Julian Merriweather (born 1978), collagist, painter
- William McBride (artist) (1912–2000), artist, designer and collector
- Howard McCalebb (born 1947), artist
- Hugo McCloud (born 1980), visual artist
- Corky McCoy, illustrator
- Charles McGee, (1924–2021), painter
- Charles McGill (1964–2017), artist, educator
- Julie Mehretu (born 1970), painter, printmaker
- Yvonne Cole Meo (1923–2016), sculptor, printmaker
- Troy Michie (born 1985), collage artist, painter, interdisciplinary installation artist, and sculptor
- Sam Middleton (1927–2015), mixed-media artist
- Nicole Miller (born 1982), video artist
- Joe Minter (born 1943), sculptor, creator of African Village in America
- Dean Mitchell (born 1957), painter
- Evangeline Montgomery (born 1930), metal art, printmaker
- Scipio Moorhead (active 1770s), painter
- Barbara Tyson Mosley (born 1950), abstract painter
- Charles Franklin Moss (1878–1961), photographer and painter
- Archibald Motley (1891–1981), painter
- Zora J. Murff (born 1987), photographer
- Jayson Musson, musician and artist
- Wangechi Mutu (born 1972), painter, sculptor
- Gus Nall (1919–1995), painter
- Senga Nengudi (born 1943), sculptor, performance artist
- Harold Newton (1934–1994), artist
- Odili Donald Odita (born 1966), abstract artist
- Lorraine O'Grady (1934–2024), conceptual artist
- Mary Lovelace O'Neal (born 1942), artist and arts educator
- Turtel Onli (born 1952), cartoonist
- Jackie Ormes (1911–1985), cartoonist
- John Outterbridge (1933–2020), assemblage artist
- Joe Overstreet (1933–2019), artist

=== P–S ===
- Jennifer Packer (born 1985), painter
- Norman Parish (1937–2013), painter, muralist and art dealer
- Gordon Parks (1912–2006), photographer, director
- Sandra Payne (1951–2021), collagist, sculptor, conceptual artist
- Adam Pendleton (born 1984), conceptual artist
- Cecelia Pedescleaux (born 1945), quilter
- Janet Taylor Pickett (born 1948), mixed media artist
- Delilah Pierce (1904–1992), artist
- Earle M. Pilgrim (1923–1976), artist
- Howardena Pindell (born 1943), painter
- Jefferson Pinder (born 1970), performance
- Jerry Pinkney (1939–2021), illustrator
- Adrian Piper (born 1948), conceptual artist
- Rose Piper (1917–2005), painter and textile designer
- Horace Pippin (1888–1946), painter
- William Pleasant Jr. (1928–1997), painter
- P. H. Polk (1898–1984), photographer
- Stephanie Pogue (1944–2002), printmaker
- Carl Robert Pope (born 1961), photographer
- William Pope.L (born 1955), conceptual artist
- Charles Ethan Porter (1847/49–1923), painter
- Harriet Powers (1837–1910), folk artist
- Walter Price (artist) (born 1989), painter
- Martin Puryear (born 1941), sculptor
- Mavis Pusey (1928–2019), abstract painter
- Bob Ragland (1938–2021), painter and sculptor
- Rammellzee (1960–2010)
- Helen Evans Ramsaran (born 1943), sculptor
- Robin Rhode (born 1976)
- John Rhoden (1916–2001), sculptor
- Earle Wilton Richardson (1912–1935), artist
- Taft Richardson Jr. (1943–2008), folk artist
- Faith Ringgold (1930–2024), painter
- Haywood Rivers (1922–2001), painter
- Amber Robles-Gordon (born 1977), installation artist
- Deborah Roberts, (born 1962), collage artist
- Arthur Rose Sr. (1921–1995), multidisciplinary
- Bayeté Ross Smith (born 1976), photographer
- Nellie Mae Rowe (1900–1982)
- Alison Saar (born 1956), artist
- Betye Saar (1926–2026), artist
- Synthia Saint James (born 1949), painter
- Charles L. Sallée Jr. (1923–2006), painter
- Reginald Sanders (1921–2001), visual artist
- Raymond Saunders (1934–2025), painter
- Augusta Savage (1892–1962), sculptor
- Dread Scott (born 1965), performance, photography, installation, screen-printing and video
- John T. Scott (1940–2007), artist
- Joyce J. Scott (born 1948), sculptor
- Lorenzo Scott (born 1934), painter
- William Edouard Scott (1884–1964), painter
- Charles Searles (1937–2004), painter, sculptor
- Charles Sebree (1914–1985), painter
- Gail Shaw-Clemons, printmaker, educator
- Yinka Shonibare (born 1962)
- Thomas Sills (1914–2000), painter
- Gary Simmons (born 1964), artist
- Lorna Simpson (born 1960), artist
- Merton Simpson (1928–2013), painter
- William Simpson (1818–1872), portrait painter
- Ferrari Sheppard (born 1983), painter
- Amy Sherald (born 1973), painter
- Cauleen Smith (born 1967), filmmaker
- Leslie Smith III (born 1985), painter
- Shinique Smith (born 1971)
- Susan Smith-Pinelo, video, performance
- Vincent D. Smith (1929–2003), painter and printmaker
- William E. Smith (1913–1997), painter and printmaker
- Gilda Snowden (1954–2014)
- Sylvia Snowden (born 1942), abstract painter
- Carroll Sockwell (1943–1992), abstract painter
- Jeff Sonhouse (born 1968), painter
- Vaughn Spann (born 1992), printmaker and painter
- Mitchell Squire (born 1958), American installation artist, sculptor and performance artist
- Raymond Steth (1916–1997)
- Renee Stout (born 1958), artist
- Lou Stovall (1937–2023), printmaker
- Tavares Strachan (born 1979), conceptual artist
- Thelma Johnson Streat (1911–1959), American painter, dancer, educator
- Martine Syms (born 1988), artist

=== T–Z ===
- Henry Ossawa Tanner (1859–1937), artist
- Ron Tarver (born 1957), photographer, artist, and educator
- Mary Lee Tate (1893–1939), painter, decorative artist
- U.S. Grant Tayes (1885–1972), painter, barber, musician, columnist, and educator
- Margaret Taylor-Burroughs (1915–2010)
- Alma Thomas (1891–1978), painter
- Hank Willis Thomas (born 1976), photographer
- Mickalene Thomas (born 1971), painter and installation artist
- Bob Thompson (1937–1966), painter
- Mildred Thompson (1935–2003), abstract painter, printmaker and sculptor
- Dox Thrash (1892–1962), printmaker, sculptor
- Bill Traylor (1856–1949)
- Henry Taylor (born 1958), painter
- Yvonne Edwards Tucker (born 1941), potter
- Adejoke Tugbiyele (born 1977), sculptor, multidisciplinary artist
- Morrie Turner (1923–2014), cartoonist
- Leo Twiggs (born 1934), painter and educator
- James Van Der Zee (1886–1983), photographer
- Kara Walker (born 1969), artist
- William Walker (1927–2011), Chicago muralist
- Eugene Warburg, (1825–1859), sculptor
- Laura Wheeler Waring (1887–1948), painter
- E. M. Washington (born 1962), printmaker and counterfeiter
- Cullen Washington, Jr. (born 1972), abstract painter
- James W. Washington, Jr. (1908–2000), painter and sculptor
- Howard N. Watson (1929–2022), watercolor painter
- Richard J. Watson (born 1946), painter, printmaker
- Lewis Watts (born 1946), photographer, curator, art historian and educator
- Carrie Mae Weems (born 1953), photographer
- Joyce Wellman (born 1949), painter, printmaker
- Pheoris West (1950–2021), artist and educator
- Charles Wilbert White (1918–1979), muralist
- Folayemi Wilson, interdisciplinary artist and designer
- Jack Whitten (1939–2018), painter
- Kehinde Wiley (born 1977), painter
- Gerald Williams (artist) (born 1941), painter
- Moses Williams (c. 1777 – c. 1830), silhouettist
- William T. Williams (born 1942), painter
- Deborah Willis (born 1948), photographer
- Ellis Wilson (1899–1977), painter
- Fred Wilson (born 1954), conceptual artist
- Wilmer Wilson IV (born 1989), performance, photographer
- John Woodrow Wilson (1922–2015), sculptor
- Frank Wimberley, (1926–2025), painter
- Beulah Woodard (1895–1955), sculptor
- Hale Woodruff (1900–1980), painter
- Richard Wyatt, Jr. (born 1955), painter, muralist
- Richard Yarde (1939–2011), watercolorist
- Joseph Yoakum (1890–1972), self-taught landscape artist
- Kenneth Victor Young (1933–2017), painter, designer, educator
- Purvis Young (1943–2010), artist
- Brenna Youngblood (1979–), painter, sculptor, collagist

== Artist groups ==
- The Highwaymen
- AfriCOBRA
- Where We At
- Spiral (arts alliance)

== See also ==
- African-American art
- Black Abstractionism
- Black Arts Movement
- Harlem Renaissance
- The Quilts of Gees Bend
- List of American artists before 1900
- List of American artists 1900 and after
