= Joyce Wellman =

American printmaker

- Born: 1949 (age 76–77); New York, NY, United States
- Education: Bronx Community College, City College of New York, University of Massachusetts, Maryland Institute College of Art
- Style: Painting, printmaking
- Movement: Black Arts Movement
- Website: www.joycewellman.com

Joyce Wellman is an American artist who specializes in painting and printmaking. Born in Brooklyn, she attended community college before earning a degree at the City College of New York. She would later earn two master's degree, one in education and one in art. She initially focused on printmaking but later turned her focus to painting. She briefly worked as a teacher before spending a few years on sabbatical. During that time, she worked on her art portfolio, receiving help from artists, including Valerie Maynard.

In 1981, Wellman moved to Washington, D.C., and still resides there. She became friends with local artists, including Sam Gilliam, who taught her various techniques to improve her painting. Since 1985, exhibitions have displayed Wellman's work at The Phillips Collection, Maryland Art Place, Kreeger Museum, and the National Museums of Kenya, among others. In a review of one of her exhibitions, Mark Jenkins from The Washington Post said Wellman's paintings are "dense with references" and "elaborately textured."

== Biography ==
=== Early life ===
Joyce Wellman was born in 1949 in Brooklyn. She attended Bronx Community College before attending the City College of New York (CCNY), where she earned a bachelor's degree in 1972. She had been inspired to attend CCNY after a friend told her "Black kids in New York City public schools need more strong black role models!", so Wellman decided to become a teacher, "one of the most constructive forms of activism" according to her. Unfortunately for Wellman, there were no teaching positions available. After speaking with her father, a public school employee, the principal asked her of her father's school, "Can you teach arts and crafts?" She replied yes and began teaching. In 1974, Wellman's interest in art began with printmaking, and she worked at local printmaking studios. At the Studio Museum in Harlem she worked under artist Valerie Maynard. Her first solo exhibition took place around this time, at the Cinque Gallery in New York City.

A few years later, in 1977, Wellman earned her master's degree in education from the University of Massachusetts. She continued her education in the 1980s when she studied painting at the Maryland Institute College of Art. Describing her interest in art, Wellman said: "During the 1970s and early-1980s my concern was discovering a means by which to create an art vocabulary and grammar that included vibrant colors, cryptic marks, shapes and symbols that referenced mathematics, anthropomorphic forms and personal experiences and references to my growing up in a household where 'The numbers' were played. I was on a journey to create work in the printmaking medium that became vehicles by which the viewer could journey through contemplative space." While studying under artists Krishna Reddy and Ed Clarke, her interest in painting began.

=== Career ===
In 1979, Wellman often visited Washington, D.C., where she worked in a printmaking shop and visited family members. She ended up moving to Washington, D.C., in 1981, where she worked with Percy Martin and other artists. While taking a four-year sabbatical, Wellman helped coordinate a "Fusion Arts" program where people of all ages could come and explore their artistic sides and meet musicians, dancers, and visual artists.

During the 1980s, Wellman continued her focus on painting, drawing, and mixed media. Wellman said she wanted to expand her artistic skills because "It has always been through abstraction that I have sought to express my feelings." She worked as director of the Art Barn Association's Arts and the Aging Workshop Program, where people with dementia could express themselves via art. During this time, Wellmaqn associated with Where We At a collective of Black women artists affiliated with the Black Arts Movement.

In 1985, Wellman's solo exhibition took place at the University of the District of Columbia (UDC). The following year Wellman's work was featured in The International Review of African American Art, in an issue discussing printmaking, and participated in a group exhibition at the Washington Women's Arts Center alongside Sylvia Snowden and Denise Ward-Brown. The late 1980s is when she began focusing solely on painting, after spending a few years working on etching and graphic design. Her works sometimes included the letters S.O.S., which Wellman said represented "We all need each other." She participated in a group exhibition at the Washington Project for the Arts in 1989.

The Big 5 (2005), The Phillips Collection

In the following decade, Wellman was frequently featured in solo and group exhibitions and earned her master's in fine arts at the Maryland Institute College of Art. Places where her exhibitions took place include the Arlington Arts Center, the Anacostia Community Museum, the Howard University Gallery of Art, the Maryland Art Place, and the Rockville Arts Place, where her work was shown alongside photographer Linda Day Clark and Michael B. Platt. In 1992, she became the director of a UDC arts program when not working in her studio, where she was visited by Sam Gilliam and other artists.

Around the same time, she began working on an exhibition for teenagers who lived in youth detention centers. Titled Expressions D.C, Wellman said the exhibition "offers an opportunity to view African American youth-at-risk in a new light. The exhibition allows us to view and experience their joy in spite of the pain they feel being separated from home and community." In one review of a group exhibit featuring Wellman, a report for The Washington Post said Wellman's "abstract paintings feature multiple layers of paint, a palette of bright, luscious colors, and glossy surfaces."

Wellman continued to have success with exhibitions in the 2000s at the Kenkeleba House in New York City, the National Museums of Kenya, Dillard University, North Carolina A&T State University, the New Door Creative Gallery in Baltimore, the University of Arkansas, and the U.S. embassy in Georgetown, Guyana. Her solo exhibition at the Kenkeleba House in 2004 was reviewed by The New York Times. Journalist Grace Glueck wrote Wellman's "paintings, drawings and monotypes are lighthearted but mystical compositions in which layered geometric shapes and fragments interact on grounds of translucent color" and that her art "speaks a language we can't fathom, but there's substance to it."

In a review of her exhibition at the New Door Creative Gallery, journalist Glenn McNatt wrote about Wellman's fascination with numbers: "What impressed Wellman as a youngster was the fervent belief on the part of many of her neighbors that the astronomical odds against winning could be beaten (or at least lowered significantly) by paying close attention to random sequences of digits encountered in daily life -- phone numbers, birthdays, license plates, the due dates on electricity bills and the like."

In the 2010s, Wellman's group and solo exhibitions continued. Local museums that hosted exhibitions include the Kreeger Museum, the Heurich House Museum, and the Katzen Arts Center. Elsewhere, they took place at the Kenkeleba House, New Door Creative Gallery, the Erie Canal Museum, the Harmony Hall Arts Center in Baltimore, the State University of New York at Geneseo, and the Columbus Museum. In a review in The Washington Post, Mark Jenkins called Wellman's works "dense with references" and noted how her paintings were "elaborately textured."

Her first exhibition in the 2020s took place at the Foundry Gallery in Washington, D.C., and was an homage to Edward Clark, one of her many mentors throughout her life. Additional exhibitions took place at the Featherstone Center for the Arts in Massachusetts, The Phillips Collection, and the Georgia Museum of Art.

== See also ==
- African-American art
- List of African-American visual artists
