= William McBride (artist) =

African-American artist, designer and collector

- Born: William Thacker McBride Jr. 1912; New Orleans, Louisiana
- Died: August 11, 2000 (aged 87–88); Chicago, Illinois, United States
- Education: The Art Institute of Chicago

William Thacker McBride Jr. (September 27, 1912- August 11, 2000) was an African-American artist, designer and collector. McBride began his career in the 1930s in the circles of black art collectives and artistic opportunities afforded by the Works Progress Administration. He would ultimately leave his mark in Chicago as a driving force behind the South Side Community Art Center. McBride distinguished himself as a teacher, as a cultural and political activist, and as a collector of African art and artwork by black artists of his generation.

== Personal life ==
William McBride Jr. was born in 1912 in Algiers, New Orleans. He was the second of three children of William and Mary McBride. When he was around ten years old, he joined the so-called Great Migration of African Americans as he and his family moved to the Chicago's South Side, where he attended St. Elizabeth grammar school and Wendell Phillips High School. McBride died on August 11, 2000, at the Alden Princeton Rehabilitation Center in Chicago, at the age of 87.

== Artistic career ==
=== Arts and Crafts Guild ===
Early in his life, McBride was interested in the visual arts. In the early 1930s, he took classes at the School of the Art Institute of Chicago, and he went on to join a collective of young black artists known as the Arts and Crafts Guild. The guild was formed by George Neal during the Great Depression, and its members met regularly to share techniques and skills, discuss art and politics, and raise funds for their own exhibitions and artistic pursuits.

=== Civilian Conservation Corps ===
While collaborating with the Arts and Crafts Guild, McBride also worked for the New Deal's Civilian Conservation Corps. By 1935, McBride was working as an artist through the Federal Art Project of the Works Progress Administration (WPA), Illinois Art Project. Among his various WPA projects, McBride designed books and sketched costumes for the Federal Theater Project, including for such productions as the theatrical adaptation of Helen Bannerman's 1899 children's book, Little Black Sambo.

=== South Side Community Art Center ===
McBride is also credited as an early supporter and featured artist of the South Side Community Art Center (SSCAC). The SSCAC was established by the Federal Art Project/Works Project Administration as an inner-city community art center located in a former mansion on S. Michigan Avenue in Chicago. The SSCAC was formally dedicated in 1941, but held its first exhibition on December 15, 1940. The exhibition featured paintings that had already been on display at the American Negro Exposition held in Chicago earlier that year. McBride's paintings were featured in the exhibition alongside works by his contemporaries, including Henry Avery, William Carter, Charles White, Archibald Motley Jr., Joseph Kersey, Margaret Taylor Goss (later Margaret Taylor-Burroughs), and Bernard Goss. Margaret Taylor Goss proclaimed the mission of the SSCAC as the "defense of culture." When the country entered World War II, the federal government drastically reduced WPA spending, with all federal funding for art projects terminating in 1943. Despite losing federal assistance, the SSCAC nevertheless remained active through local fundraising and community support. To this day, the SSCAC remains the only surviving community art center created under the WPA.

=== Promotional designs ===
During the early 1940s, McBride served as publicity director of the SSCAC. He became renowned for his designs in souvenir books and posters for the SSCAC's Artists and Models Ball, which was the organization's annual fundraising gala. The first Artists and Models Ball was held in 1939. The event was considered a marquee calendar event in the Bronzeville neighborhood. McBride also created Christmas cards for the nearby tavern The Brass Rail.

McBride's souvenir books and concert programs included advertisements for, representations of, and endorsements from many sectors of black Chicago society, such as the Metropolitan Mutual Assurance Company, a black Chicago insurance company. The promotional items created by McBride for the SSCAC would go on to become some of his most celebrated works.

=== Performing Arts ===
In the 1940s, McBride wrote a number of mostly unpublished plays, poems, and songs, and through the 1950s he was active in the Black Chicago Renaissance dance scene. McBride served as art director for both the annual Sadie Bruce Dance Revue and the annual concert of the Mildred B. Haessler Ballet Group.

=== Silkscreen prints ===
McBride learned screen-printing while working for the display section of Goldblatt's, a chain of department stores in Chicago. McBride later famously became inspired by African masks, and incorporated them into his screenprints, as in his series of prints featuring masks in the early 1940s. McBride "looked to Africa for a visual language," which he found in traditional African art exhibited in natural history museums and textile designs he reportedly came across in the British publication The Illustrated London News.

=== Art collector ===
McBride was known as "a collector's collector." He traveled to postcolonial nations such as Ghana, Benin, and Nigeria, and collected African art to bring back to the United States. For this he is credited with helping to raise awareness in Chicago of the art and culture of the black diaspora. McBride was also interested in documenting his own community in South Side Chicago. Commenting on McBride's collecting habits, an observer quoted in a Chicago Tribune article described McBride as having gone "to virtually every art show, live performance and play, anything that was happening in the vibrant world of the South Side from the late 1930s to the early 1980s. And he'd go to an event and pull the paper off the wall and take it home."

Early on, McBride recognized the talents of his fellow Chicago artists such as Charles White, Eldzier Cortor, William Carter, Charles Sebree, Richard Hunt, Marion Perkins, Margaret Tayler Goss Burroughs, Gordon Parks, Joseph Kersey, and over time built his own collection of their works. In 1995, McBride donated his collection of thousands of posters, playbills, exhibition catalogs and other ephemera to the Chicago Public Library's Vivian G. Harsh Collection of Afro-American History and Literature, a major repository of African American artists' activities in Chicago between the 1920s and the 1950s. His papers include early SSCAC organizational and publicity files, as well as extensive files of cultural and political activities, correspondence, fliers, programs, posters, playbills, art studies and photographs.

== Selected exhibitions ==
"Alone in Crowd: Prints of the 1930s and 1940s by African-American Artists From the Collection of Reba and Dave Williams" an exhibition organised and circulated by American Federation of Arts, opening at Newark Museum, N.J. and the Equitable Gallery, N.Y., Dec.10 1992-Feb.28, 1993.African American Designers in Chicago: Art, Commerce, and the Politics of Race Exhibitions, Chicago Department of Cultural Affairs & Special Events, October 27, 2018 – March 3, 2019

== Selected Collections ==
The Metropolitan Museum of Art, New York, NY

Cooper Hewitt, Smithsonian Design Museum, New York, NY

DuSable Museum of African American History, Chicago, IL
