= Walter Ellison =

American painter (1899–1977)

- Born: 1899; Georgia
- Died: 1977 (aged 77–78)

Walter Ellison (1899–1977) was an African American artist, born in the state of Georgia.

Although the American Civil War had ended in 1865, African Americans still faced many difficulties at the turn of the century, so many of them left the South and moved North in search for better opportunities; Ellison was one of them.

== Early life ==
Born in Eatonton, Georgia, according to census and draft records Ellison was a farm hand. He was 18 years old when the United States decided to enter World War I in Europe in 1917 and immigration from Europe to the United States virtually stopped. Because of that, between 1916 and 1970 seven million African Americans left the South for the North, in what became known as the Great Migration, with about half a million of them going to Chicago looking for jobs and new opportunities. Ellison boarded the train to Chicago in the early 1920s in search of an education and a job.

He attended classes at the School of the Art Institute of Chicago (SAIC) and at Hull House. He was employed on the Illinois Art Project of the WPA and was a founding member of the South Side Community Art Center, along with a number of younger black artists, including Margaret Burroughs, Eldzier Cortor, Gordon Parks, Charles Sebree, and Charles White. He also became involved in the Civil Rights Movement.

== Art and work ==
Ellison is best known for intimately-scaled works that reveal the private lives and shared experiences of African Americans who moved to northern cities from the rural South between World War I and II.

His most famous painting, Train Station, held in the Art Institute of Chicago, depicts white people on one side of a station platform, identified as being in Macon, Georgia, who are heading south for luxury holidays, with African Americans carrying their bags, and African Americans on the other side of the platform, carrying their own luggage, boarding a train for the North and a new start.

In an untitled painting created in 1937, Ellison depicts a well-made-up African American woman lying back in a beautician's chair with her eyes closed and her temples being massaged. Only the beautician's hands are seen, with her fingernails featuring a "French manicure" – red centers with white moons and tips – a style that has obviously captivated the artist. The woman being massaged seems millions of miles away from whatever might have been troubling her that day.
