= Lawrence Arthur Jones =

American artist and printmaker

- Born: 1910; Lynchburg, VA
- Died: 1996 (aged 85–86)
- Education: Art Institute of Chicago; Dillard University; Taller de Grafica Popular; University of Mississippi

Lawrence Arthur Jones (1910-1996) was an American artist and printmaker. Born in Lynchburg, Virginia, Jones spent most of his career as an art teacher in Louisiana, Georgia, and Mississippi. He was a contemporary of the prominent black artists Charles White and Eldzier Cortor. Jones's most notable accomplishment is his establishment of a fine arts program at Jackson State University in Mississippi.

Though Jones is best known as an arts educator, his work is present in a number of important institutions and museums. Many of his murals on campuses throughout the South still remain. His oeuvre features prints, paintings, and murals that tend to focus on the history of African-Americans in the United States. His figurative artwork often depicts the oppression of black people across various time periods and geographic contexts. Jones portrayed slavery in the South and urban poverty in the North in many paintings, murals, and prints.

== Life and career ==
Lawrence Arthur Jones was born in 1910 in Lynchburg, Virginia, the oldest of 12 siblings. An interesting point of pride for the Jones family was that they claimed to be descendants of Sally Hemings, a slave on Thomas Jefferson's plantation. Jones grew up fairly poor, but from an early age he displayed a keen talent for drawing. In high school, Jones attended a segregated school that was underfunded and did not have an art department. However, despite Dunbar High School's deficient program, Lawrence found artistic opportunity drawing charts, sketches, and decorations for the high school. In 1927, Lawrence's senior year of high school, the famous Harlem poet James Weldon Johnson spoke at Dunbar High School. During Johnson's stay in Lynchburg, Jones showed the poet his drawings, and Johnson was so impressed with the young artist's work that he suggested that Jones pursue further education in art after graduating high school.

Due to Jim Crow laws in Virginia, Jones was not able to attend art school in Virginia and instead registered at the Art Institute of Chicago in 1934. To pay tuition Jones worked and raised money from members of his local community who were supportive and wanted to see his artistic talent realized. The Virginia state senator Carter A. Glass even wrote on Jones's behalf. His community in Lynchburg was able to raise about 700 dollars. This was not all together enough to pay for a full term at the Art Institute of Chicago, so Jones briefly worked as a busboy in Albany, NY. Upon his arrival in Chicago in 1932, Jones also worked a short period for the WPA/FAP to raise the rest of the money for his education. Jones attended the Art Institute of Chicago from 1934 to 1936 and befriended the accomplished artists and fellow Chicago Institute students Charles White, Frank Neal, and Eldzier Cortor. Throughout the 1930s Chicago had a rapidly growing African-American arts community and Lawrence Jones was involved in creating the first black community art center in Chicago, the South Side Community Art Center. While studying in Chicago, Jones also worked in the art studios at Hull House where he met Gertrude Stein. Like James Weldon Johnson, Stein was impressed by Jones's artistic talent.

=== Teaching career ===
==== Dillard University ====
Jones did not complete his degree at the Art Institute of Chicago and left to teach painting at Dillard University in New Orleans in 1936. Though it is generally recorded that Elizabeth Catlett is responsible for starting the art department at Dillard, Jones contended that he actually started the program, but could not be credited because he technically did not have a degree yet. Jones taught and studied at Dillard from 1936 to 1940 and attained a bachelor's degree in dramatic arts from the university. Before leaving Dillard, Jones was awarded a Rosenwald Fellowship to study at the famed Taller de Gráfica Popular in Mexico.

==== Taller de Gráfica Popular and Fort Valley State University ====
At the Taller de Gráfica Popular in Mexico, Jones learned how to make woodcut and linocut prints and mingled with visiting artists like Diego Rivera and José Orozco. Jones left Mexico in 1941 to teach at Fort Valley State College in Georgia. One of the students he taught was Benny Andrews, who would go on to become an accomplished African-American artist. In 1942, during WWII, Jones was drafted into the American army and stationed at Fort McClellan in Alabama. In the army Jones became an illustrator and painted the mural "Negro Work and Life in Georgia" at Fort McClellan. The Mural depicted rural life in the south for black farmers. Jones was discharged from the Army in 1946 and returned to his teaching position at Fort Valley State University.

==== Jackson State University ====
In 1949 Jones left Georgia to start a new art department at Jackson State University in Mississippi. Teaching at Jackson State until the 1970s, Jones drastically expanded the University's art department to include ceramics, drama, art history, and interior design. One of his students at Jackson State University was the fashion designer Patrick Kelly.

==== University of Mississippi ====
From 1970 to 1971 took a sabbatical from Jackson State University to get his MFA from the University of Mississippi. While studying to attain his MFA, Jones taught drawing at Ole Miss, where he was one of two black instructors at the time.

== Awards and honors ==
1940 - Fellowship from the Rosenwald Fund to study printmaking at the Taller de Gráfica Popular

1963 - Jones's painting "Past, Present, Future" wins first honorable mention at the Atlanta University annual art show.

1964 - "Past, Present, Future" wins the Karl Douglas Trophy and second place painting at the Chicago Centennial Show of Black Progress.

Awarded Carnegie Fellowship to study pottery.

== Selected collections ==
- Metropolitan Museum of Art, New York, New York.
- Jackson State University Art Gallery, Jackson, Mississippi.
- The Print Research Foundation, Greenwich, Connecticut.
- The National Gallery of Art, Washington, District of Columbia.
- St. Louis Art Museum, St. Louis, Missouri.

Jones's murals can be seen at Fort Valley State University and Jackson State University. Jones is also known to have painted murals in churches and other community buildings in locales where he lived, but the location and preservation of these works has not been fully recorded.

== Artworks ==
- In the Alley, 1936, The Metropolitan Museum of Art
- Seated Man with Suitcase, 1937, The Metropolitan Museum of Art
- The Ghetto, Maxwell Street, 1937, The Metropolitan Museum of Art
- Street Workers Resting, 1937, The Metropolitan Museum of Art
- Hull House, Chicago, 1937, The Metropolitan Museum of Art
- Poland '46, 1946, National Gallery of Art
