= Mary Lee Tate =

American artist (1893–1939)

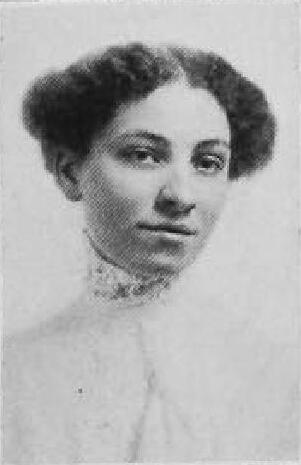
- Tate in 1911
- Born: September 16, 1893; Maysville, Kentucky, United States
- Died: July 15, 1939 (aged 45); Cincinnati, Ohio, United States
- Burial place: Spring Grove Cemetery, Cincinnati, Ohio, United States
- Education: University of Cincinnati (BA), Cincinnati Art Academy, University of Chicago
- Occupation(s): Visual artist, teacher
- Known for: Painting

Mary Lee Tate (1893–1939), was an American visual artist and teacher. She was known for her landscape and decorative paintings, which exhibited nationally. Tate was African American, and had also worked as an art teacher at local Black schools in Cincinnati, Ohio.

== Early life and education ==
Mary Lee Tate was born on September 16, 1893, in Maysville, Kentucky into an African American family, her parents were Anna (née Ramey) and Harry Tate. Some sources have her date of birth as 1890. Tate graduated from Walnut Hills High School.

She attended the University of Cincinnati, and graduated with a BA degree in 1911; she continued her studies at the Cincinnati Art Academy (now Art Academy of Cincinnati), and at the University of Chicago. The entire family moved to Cincinnati, Ohio by 1920.

== Career ==
After graduation in 1911, Tate worked as a public school art teacher at the Fredrick Douglass School (formerly the Douglas School for Negro Children) in Cincinnati. She and another teacher at the Douglas School were sued by a student in 1918, for allegations of a physical assault. In the 1930s, Tate taught art classes at the Harriet Beecher Stowe Junior High School (also known as the Harriet Beecher Stowe School, or the Stowe School) in Cincinnati.

Tate exhibited her artwork at the New York Public Library, in 1921; with the Harmon Foundation, between 1928 and 1931; and with the Smithsonian Institution, in 1930. Her notable works include Summer; Twilight; A Mountain Trail; In the Canyon; and Morning Mist.

== Death and legacy ==
She died in Cincinnati on July 15, 1939, in a car accident. The driver that hit Tate's car was convicted after the incident of second degree manslaughter, and by May 1940, the driver was on probation.

She has work that is part of the Thomas J. Watson Library, the main research library of the Metropolitan Museum of Art. Her profile was included in the books Negro Artists: an Illustrated Review of their Achievements, by the Harmon Foundation (1991 reprint edition); and Afro-American Artists. A Bio-bibliographical Directory (1973), authored and edited by Theresa Dickson Cederholm.

== See also ==
- List of African-American visual artists
