= Camp Robert Smalls =

US Naval training facility in Illinois

Coordinates: 42°18′35″N 87°51′02″W

A Navy Captain inspects Service School personnel, 2 April 1943 at Camp Robert Smalls. (Official U.S. Navy Photograph, National Archives.)

Camp Robert Smalls was a United States Naval training facility, created pursuant to an order signed April 21, 1942, by Frank Knox, then Secretary of the Navy, for the purpose of training African-American seamen at a time when the USN was still segregated by race.

The camp was located inside the Great Lakes Naval Training Center in Illinois and named for Robert Smalls, a black naval hero of the American Civil War. The camp's first commander was Lieutenant Commander Daniel Armstrong, whose father had founded the Hampton Institute and had "brought him up to understand race problems." The Navy began enlisting Negro seamen on June 1, 1942, and the first class of 277 enlistees began training at Camp Robert Smalls later that month. Of that class, 222 completed the training successfully on September 3, 1942. 102 of those graduates were chosen to continue with specialized training, and the rest of the class was assigned to routine duties.

The first classes of men to be trained at the camp had "no hope of being commissioned." However, the Navy began training officer candidates at Camp Robert Smalls towards the end of 1943.

Robert Smalls's great-grandson, Edward Estes Davidson, trained at Camp Robert Smalls, as did Owen Dodson, Larry Doby, Clark Terry, and Charles Sebree.

== See also ==
- Executive Order 9981
- Golden Thirteen
