= William Simpson (portrait artist) =

Artist and civil rights activist

- Born: William H. Simpson c.1818 Buffalo, New York, US
- Died: 1872; Boston, Massachusetts, US
- Occupation: Portrait painter
- Known for: Painting, civil right activist

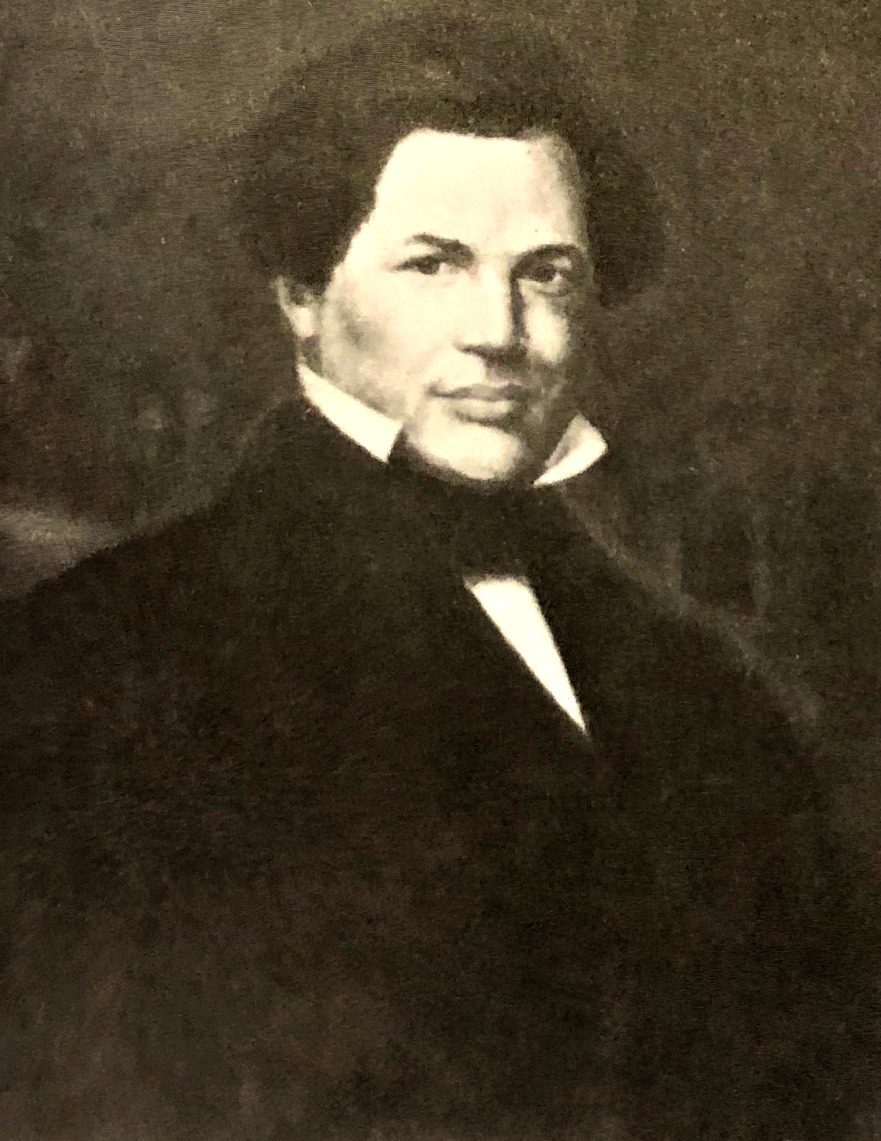
Portrait of Bishop Jermain Wesley Loguen (1835) by William Simpson

William H. Simpson (c.1818 – 1872) was an African American artist and civil right activist in the 19th century, known for his portraits.

== Bibliography ==
William Simpson was born c.1818 in Buffalo, New York to an African American family. He apprenticed with British–American Neoclassical portraitist and miniature painter, Matthew Henry Wilson (1814–1892). In 1854, Simpson moved to Boston where he became known for his portrait paintings. He is known for his portraits of Jermain Wesley Loguen, a former slave who became bishop of the African Methodist Episcopal Church in New York. Other subjects of his portrait paintings include Caroline Loguen, the wife of Jermain Loguen; Charles Sumner, the abolitionist and statesman; and John T. Hilton, the abolitionist, author, and businessman.

After 1866, Simpson moved back to Buffalo, New York, and also lived throughout the Northern part of the United States and Canada. He became an active speaker against slavery and participated in the Underground Railroad. His painting style and aesthetic was influenced by European painting, which was common at the time for American artists. However unlike the majority of American artists of his time, Simpson documented the lives of the first African American leaders.

His work is included in public museum collections including at Howard University Gallery of Art, and the Frick Collection in the art reference library.

== See also ==
- List of African-American visual artists
