= Barbara Tyson Mosley =

American artist (born 1950)

- Born: 1950 (age 75–76); Harrisburg, Pennsylvania, US
- Education: University of the District of Columbia, Georgetown University
- Known for: abstract fine art

Barbara Tyson Mosley (born 1950) is an American artist, known for her abstract landscape paintings, mix media artwork, photography, and fiber art. She is active in Louisville, Kentucky and within the Black community.

== Biography ==
Barbara Tyson Mosley was born in 1950 in Harrisburg, Pennsylvania. She attended the University of the District of Columbia and has a Bachelor of Arts degree in Studio Arts/Painting and Georgetown University and has a Master of Arts degree in Liberal Studies/Humanities.

Her work is in various public collections including San Bernardino County Museum of Art, the National Gallery of Art, the Corcoran Gallery of Art (within the Evans-Tibbs Collection of African-American Artists), the University of Virginia Medical Center, among others.

== See also ==
- List of African-American visual artists
