= William Howard (artist) =

American woodworker and craftsman

- Born: active 19th century
- Died: Kirkwood, Madison County, Mississippi
- Known for: relief woodcarving, decorative art, writing desks
- Style: Neoclassical, Federalist, Folk Art

William Howard was an American woodworker and craftsman who lived in Mississippi during the mid-nineteenth century. Howard is known for his relief carvings that depict common tools and objects from daily life including cutlery, scissors, hammers, and pitchers. Once enslaved by William McWillie, the governor of Mississippi, Howard continued to work at the Kirkwood Plantation following the Civil War.

== Collections ==
- Minneapolis Institute of Art
- Ricco/Maresca
- Wadsworth Atheneum
