= Manuelita Brown =

American sculptor

- Education: Oregon State University; University of California, San Diego
- Known for: Sculpture
- Website: www.manuelitabrown.com

Manuelita Brown is an American sculptor from San Diego, California.

== Biography ==
=== Early life and education ===
Brown has beginning in 1961, through the 1990s; Fine Art - Sculpture with Bruno Lucchesi, Scottsdale Artists, Nigel Konstam, Verrocchio Art Centre, Casole d'Elsa, Tuscany, Italy, studied and internship at Fire Arts Foundry, Layne Campbell, also earned a B.S. in Mathematics from Oregon State University in 1962, a teaching credential in secondary-level mathematics in 1966, and a M.S. in Psychology from the University of California, San Diego in 1976.

=== Career ===
Sculpting in her own studio, she has created many portraits of noted African Americans, and countless multi-cultural style sculptures in abstract, figurative realism and designs for monumental bronzes that she personally works through clay on armatures to the lost wax process. She retired from teaching in 2000 to pursue sculpting full-time, as noted in many publications as referenced. In 2018, Brown's work was on display at the "Legacy in Black" at the San Diego History Center in Balboa Park. Brown's name has been suggested as a possible artist for the statue of Shirley Chisholm, the first Black woman elected to Congress.

== Notable works ==
- 1993: Thurgood Marshall bust, Thurgood Marshall College, University of California, San Diego
- 1995: Matthew Henson bust, James E. Lewis Museum of Art, Baltimore, MD
- 1997: Almas del Mar, Westfield UTC
- 2006: Dr. Howard H. Carey bust, Neighborhood House, San Diego, CA
- 2008: Encinitas Child, Encinitas, CA
- 2008: Triton, University of California, San Diego
- 2015: Sojourner Truth statue, Thurgood Marshall College, University of California, San Diego

== Awards ==
- 2000: Finalist, Sojourner Truth Memorial statue competition, Florence, Massachusetts
- 2002: Woman of Distinction, Soroptimist
- 2015: Villager Award - Afram Global Organization Inc, #villageprojects.net
