= Linda Day Clark =

American photographer

- Linda Day Clark at the Baltimore Museum of Art in October 2026
- Education: Howard Community College (A.A.); Maryland Institute College of Art (B.F.A.); University of Delaware (M.F.A.)
- Known for: Photography

Linda Day Clark is a photographer, professor, and curator noted for capturing everyday life in African American rural and urban environments, particularly in Gee's Bend. Her work has been shown in the Philadelphia Museum of Art, the Brooklyn Museum of Art, The Lehman College, the Studio Museum in Harlem, and The Smithsonian's Anacostia Community Museum.

== Early life and education ==
Day Clark moved to Maryland when she was 8 years old. She received her Associate of Arts from Howard Community College, a Bachelor of Fine Arts from the Maryland Institute College of Art in 1994, and a Masters of Fine Art from the University of Delaware in 1996.

== Career ==
Day Clark was a program associate at the Baltimore Museum of Art until 1998, when left to become a professor of photography at Coppin State University.

In 2002, the New York Times gave Linda Day Clark an assignment to photograph the women quilters of Gee's Bend, a small town southwest of Selma, Alabama, "capturing the red clay soil, laid bare in a dirt road, so rich in color that it seems digitally tweaked but also linked to the rich colors in the quilts."
