= Taft Richardson Jr. =

American artist (1943-2008)

Taft Richardson
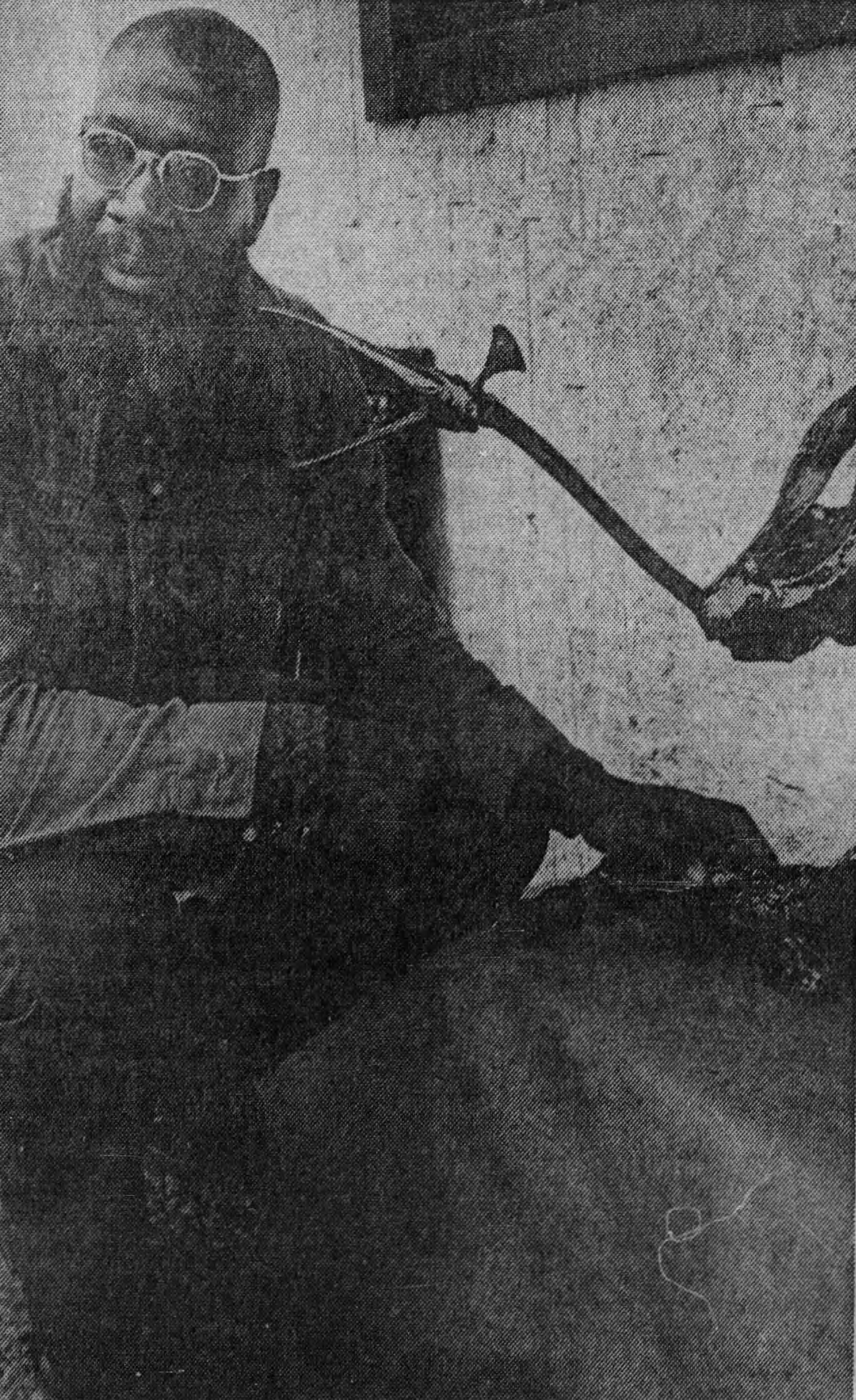
- Richardson c. 1979
- Born: Taft Richardson Jr; September 2, 1943; Lumberton, Florida, United States
- Died: November 30, 2008 (aged 65); Tampa, Florida, United States
- Occupation: Artist
- Years active: 1967–2008
- Children: 6

Taft Richardson Jr. (September 2, 1943 – November 30, 2008) was an American folk artist who sculpted dried animal bones. He enjoyed carving shapes such spiders, snakes and maps. He made an image of the continent of Africa out of tiny pieces of bone fragments. Richardson often said that he did not just create art for just viewing but he also for spiritual and religious reasons. One of his famous pieces once stood at 82 in (2,100 mm) tall. It looked like a giant snake dressed in armor. He called it the King James version in the bible, "Abaddon".

== Early life ==
Richardson was born on September 2, 1943, in Lumberton, Florida, to Taft Richardson Sr. and Mary Turner. When he was about five years old his parents moved him and his other siblings to Sulfur Springs, a district in the city of Tampa, Florida. At the age of seven, he was baptized at Spring Hill Missionary Baptist Church. He attended his early school years in a church owned by his relatives. He later attended and graduated from a segregated all-black high school. He married his first wife at the age of 19 he later separated. At the age of 22 Richardson began to collect bone and skulls of differed domestics animals like chicken, ox and lamb bones and as symbol them into forms and images that he day dreams about and in visions and glued them together and make art sculptures. He began showing his mother his work and she was very please at his gift. He also display the art work to friends and other relatives who complemented him.

In the late 1960s, Richardson left Tampa, Florida, and moved to Washington, D.C. to pursue his art career. There, he got his first job working at General Hospital. He later got a position at Howard University Medical Hospital with the help of his friend Walter Lattimore (father of R&B singer Kenny Lattimore). At Howard University he worked and studied nuclear medicine.

In D.C., Richardson spent a great deal of his off time working on his art work and displayed his Art work at Work shows in parks and youth centers around the city. He also became interested in politics and civil rights. Richardson admired civil rights icons like Martin Luther King and Malcolm X., and Black activist groups like the Black Panthers and Black militants. However, he was never a was formal member of these organizations.

Richardson began to display his art work to the public, on busy city street corners and in neighborhood parks and Art center public shows. He opened his first gallery on Kennedy St NW DC in the late 1970s with two local artists Leroy and Elbert, which they called T.E.L. gallery; on his return to Tampa he would start two more art museums: Mary's House of Israel, and in late 1980s The Moses House art gallery.

== National Known in Art World (1971–2008) ==
In the early 1970s, Richardson took his art creation on tour. He traveled around the U.S from east to west doing art shows and exhibits, from New York City to the state of California. He appeared regularly on television shows and newspaper articles.

== Personal life ==
In 2007 Richardson became ill. He continued working on his last piece of art until his death in November 2008.
