= Gail Shaw-Clemons =

American artist

Gail Shaw-Clemons is an American artist and educator known for her printmaking and mixed media art. She was born in Washington, DC and attended the University of Maryland, College Park where her teachers included David Driskell and Martin Puryear. She was an art instructor at the United Nations International School for 24 years. She resides in Washington, DC and is on the board of STABLE, a non-profit organization fostering the arts in Washington.

Shaw-Clemons' work is in the Ballinglen Museum of Art. Her artist's book Old money is in the National Museum of Women in the Arts (NMWA),

Shaw-Clemons's work was included in Phase I of the project COVID-19 PAGES: The Influence & Inspiration of Women. The print We Wear the Mask (Female) is in the collection of the Georgetown University Art Collection. Her work was included in the 2023 exhibition INTERLUDE at the Kreeger Museum.
