= Russell T. Gordon =

Russell T. Gordon (July 3, 1936 – November 2013) was an American painter and printmaker. He moved to Montreal in 1973 where he was a visiting professor then faculty member at Concordia University until he retired in 1998.

== Early life and education ==
Gordon was born in Philadelphia in 1936. He received a BFA from Temple University in 1962, an MS from the University of Wisconsin in 1966 and an MFA from University of Wisconsin in 1967.

As Gordon began his college career, he planned to study math while playing basketball on scholarship, but eventually changed his major to art before graduation. Gordon did play basketball professionally for a short time before focusing on his art career.

== Career and work ==
Gordon had numerous positions in academia and institutes including as Assistant Professor at University of California-Berkeley (1969–70), Associate Professor at Mills College in Oakland, CA (1974–75), Associate Professor at Concordia University, Montreal, Canada (1975–98), Visiting Lecturer at the San Francisco Art Institute (1969–70), and positions at University of Saskatchewan, Saskatoon Canada (1984), Lakeside Studio, Michigan (1986, 1988) East Carolina University, North Carolina (1989).

Gordon's work is represented in a wide variety of museums and personal collections. He has pieces at the Smithsonian American Art Museum, the Fine Arts Museum of San Francisco, the Musée national des beaux-arts du Québec and the Block Museum of Art at Northwestern University.

Gordon himself explains how he creates art and his art life as an artist and an art teacher and how to understand his work and elements that should be considered when watching his works. Each work of his has juxtaposition and synthesis, which are the modus operandi through which the artist shifts. He also Russell rejects "ism" and the culture of a lot of art making. He insists that it is essential to develop a capacity to make use of variety; and to understand that one can make use of the value of expression through contradiction or difference. He has been busy with this process for most of his life; it is how he comes to be who he is. He believes that images, like words, are in themselves meaningless and are resurrected in context. And abstract images are redefined in new settings and media, thereby changing their significance and at the same time, reminding us of their meaning in other situations.

"There is the additional layer of achievement: not of mere social climbing or vain self-satisfaction, but of searching for and attaining human success which serves as evidence of a man's ability to shape his own destiny and achieve his own ends. A strong Nieteschean pulse marks the levels of achievement attained by Gordon, from his initial obtention of a university diploma - to his family's largely uncaring surprise - to his position of program director in a major university art department."

"Russell Gordon's works point out the paradox of a contemporary painter using a language which is lush in detail, rich in color and prodigal in its use of shapes and forms, in order to speak to a viewing public more familiar with decoding messages from simpler, more ascetic or pared-down visual clues. The baroque figures and signs or Russell Gordon come as a bit of a jolt at a time when less is supposed to be more."

"Gordon's work takes on a Hegelian dimension when it transposes the results of an exploration of phenomena, namely those thing which present themselves to our consciousness, into a distillation of the absolute, logical, ontological and metaphysical spirit which underlies those phenomena, which in turn determine knowledge of life's essence."

Maurice Forget,

Maurice Forget further says that "the essence of Gordon's works are the organization of the pictorial space, the invention of shapes and the contrasts, conflicts, allusions, allegories and patterns which emerge from the sometimes disparate elements placed in juxtaposition." There is a celebratory current in Gordon's art.

Gordon's work reflects his own social, intellectual and moral development as a man over that time, with all of his characteristics—most notably being an American black man—he searches for universal truths which best express his own perspective on humanity. The phenomena absorbed by him—and the resulting metaphors susceptible of being followed in his work—reflect somewhat linearly the events in the artist's own life.

In leaving Philadelphia and American society, Gordon sought independence in his art, moving away from themes of race and social standing to focus on human life.

Gordon’s archives are held at Concordia University's Records Management and Archives.

== Awards ==
- 1972 - George C. Marshall Fellowship^{[unfit]}, Denmark
- 1975 - MacDowell Fellowship, New Hampshire
- 1981 - National Endowment for the Arts grant recipient
- 1986 - Award of Excellence from The Museum of Science and Industry

== Exhibitions ==
- 1985 Masks with Robert Holland Murray, Maison de la culture Côte-des-Neiges, Montreal.

== Bibliography ==
- Van Hoof, Marie. "Tension, attention (French)", A review of "Me and Monk", an exhibition. Vie des Arts, vol. 42, Issue 174, p 76. Spring 1999
- Wilson, Stuart. "Big man Gordon displays impeccable craftsmanship". The Montreal Downtowner, March 1990, p. 17.
