= Charles McGill =

American artist (1964–2017)

- Born: 1964
- Died: July 9, 2017 (aged 52–53); Peekskill, NY
- Known for: sculpture
- Awards: Pollock-Krasner Foundation, Joan Mitchell Foundation, New York Foundation of the Arts

Charles McGill (1964 – July 9, 2017) was an artist based in Peekskill, New York.

== Early life and education ==
McGill graduated from Binghamton High School, attended the School of Visual Arts, and earned his MFA at the Maryland Institute College of Art in 1989. He was an artist in residence in 1987. He was a classically trained painter that evolved into making sculpture.

== Career ==
In the work McGill was best known for, he used found objects to create sculptures and performances, particularly with references to golf as a metaphor, to critique politics surrounding race, gender and class. Part of this work included a line of decorations and accessories for black golfers. In another series from this work the artist deconstructed golf bags and sewed them onto a canvas stretcher, referencing abstract painting but on closer inspection also referencing the hoods of Ku Klux Klan.

His work has been exhibited at the Wadsworth Atheneum Museum of Art, the Virginia Museum of Fine Art, the Boca Raton Museum of Art, the Baltimore Museum of Art, and the Norton Museum of Art. He received a grants from Art Matters, the New York Foundation of the Arts in 2009, the Pollock-Krasner Foundation in 2014 and the Joan Mitchell Foundation in 2015. His work is in the permanent collection of Bridge Golf Learning Center in Harlem.

McGill taught art at Borough of Manhattan Community College, The School of Visual Arts, The Maryland Institute College of Art, Norwalk Community College and Westchester Community College.

McGill died at age 53 in 2017 from complications with cancer treatment. His work is represented by Pavel Zoubok Gallery.
