= Reginald Sanders =

Reginald Algernon Anderson (1921–2001), who exhibited under the name Reginald Sanders, was an American visual artist who created collages and pencil drawings. He was a museum guard at the Minneapolis Institute of Art for over 25 years and only began to exhibit his art in the 1990s.

== Early life and education ==
Reginald Anderson was born in Waterloo, Iowa on June 7, 1921. His family lived in St. Paul, Minnesota's Rondo neighborhood, but his mother traveled to Iowa to stay with her sister during the time of his birth. He graduated from John Marshall High School in 1942 and was spared from World War II due to his speech problems. He studied art at the University of Minnesota and the Walker Art Center and eventually graduated with a M.F.A from the Minneapolis College of Art. He was noted in 1950 by Time Magazine as one of the country's top art students and had solo shows at Kilbride-Bradley Art Gallery in Minneapolis in 1963 and the College of St. Teresa in 1966.

== Career and works ==
After two solo shows in the 1960s, Anderson didn't exhibit work for 28 years, spending his time working various jobs such as an art museum guard, streetcar maintenance worker, art supply salesman, and various factory jobs. In 1990, Anderson had a personal epiphany after a life-threatening stroke and re-dedicated himself to creating art. "I woke to the shimmering sun on my window shade and suddenly knew who I am, why I am here and what I have to offer."

In December 1993, Sanders had a joint exhibition with University of Minnesota art professor Clarence Morgan at the Minneapolis Foundation offices in the Foshay Tower. In January 1994, Anderson exhibited his works at Minneapolis's Circa Gallery and later that year attended an international conference on African American visual art at the Palais du Luxembourg in Paris, France. His trip was financed through donations from long time patrons of the museum and fellow guards. He was the subject of a 1997 film "Not A Nickel's Worth of Doubt", written and directed by his niece Terri Myers Wentzka.

Work by Anderson has been acquired for the Minneapolis Institute of Art's permanent collection.

== Influences ==
Anderson was influenced by jazz and the music of Count Basie, Duke Ellington, and Miles Davis, among others. He first started to notice his artistic inclinations when observing tadpoles on his grandmother's farm.

"Look now and you will see all these little things - the dots, the question marks, the periods, the commas, the little tadpoles in there - everything. All those little pieces that we ignore, because they're insignificant. Well, put them all together and it really turns into something."
