= Richard Gordon Kendall =

American artist

Richard Gordon Kendall (also spelled Kendell; 17 November 1933 Paris, Texas – 30 January 2008 Paris, Texas) was an American self-taught artist who, beginning around 1995, began to be chronicled as an outsider artist – in a folk artist.

== Life ==
Kendall was discovered around 1995 by Jay Wehnert, (Note: Jay Wehnert (né Jay Lawrence Wehnert; born 1956) is the director of Intuitive Eye (link), a Houston arts organization he founded in 2011. Wehnert and his wife, Victoria (née Harrison), are independent curators, writers, collectors, educators, and collaborators in a wide range of venues. Wehnert has curated shows for galleries and institutions in Texas, written for exhibition catalogs and other publications as well as his own website, presented at conferences, and worked directly with artists to present their art in a variety of settings. (Wehnert, Outsider Art in Texas: Lone Stars) Wehnert had previously been a speech-language pathologist in Baltimore, providing therapy for adult stutters.) a curator and collector of outsider art, who became an advocate of Kendall's works. According to Wehnert and other art critics, Kendall's works exhibit extraordinary use of mediums, given that, from about 1995 to about 1998, he was living in makeshift shelters on the streets of Houston. One of Wehnert's objectives was to give Kendall notable recognition as an artist – which Kendall eluded. Wehnert lost contact with Kendall in 1998 and Kendall died in 2008. As recent as 2019, Kendall's works have been exhibited by the Dutton Gallery of New York.

When Wehnert "discovered" Kendall, the two began corresponding – until about 1998. Kendall was living on the Streets of Houston. Kendall told Wehnert that he made drawings of the city's architecture to keep himself "sharp."

=== Growing up ===
Richard Gordon Kendall was born November 17, 1933, in Paris, Texas, to Lenious Kendall (aka Linnius "Bud" Kindell; 1886–1968) and Myrl Reynolds (1895–1973). His original birth certificate gave his name as Charles Gordon Kendall. But his mother filed a corrected birth certificate, sworn and subscribed August 12, 1944, re-stating his birth name as "Richard Gordon Kendall".

Kendall graduated in 1954 from Gibbons High School – a segregated high school for African Americans in Paris, Texas, which finally closed in 1966. Kendall was on the 1953–1954 basketball that won the Prairie View Conference AA State Championship. In the 1990s, Kendall lived at 769 Ash Street in Paris.

== Selected exhibitions ==
- Richard Gordon Kendall and Frank Jones: Haunts – Dutton, Lower East Side, New York, September 25, 2015 - October 8, 2015
- Self Taught: Margins Beyond, featuring the work of self taught artists, including Frank Jones (1900–1969), (Note: Frank Jones (né Frank Albert Jones; 1901–1969) was a Texas-based artist who began drawing in 1964 while serving a life sentence for murder in the Texas State Penitentiary at Huntsville. The criminal conviction, in 1949 (Registration No. 114591) – which he denied – was for "Murder with Malice Aforethought." His life prison sentence began September 19, 1949. He was paroled September 12, 1958. But his parole was revoked July 22, 1960, and he was re-incarcerated from July 28, 1960, until his death February 15, 1969.) Richard Gordon Kendall, Ike Morgan, and Johnnie Swearingen from the Intuitive Eye collection - Kirk Hopper Fine Art, Kirk Hopper Fine Art, Dallas, Texas, January 14, 2017 - February 11, 2017
- Lone Stars: A celebration of Texas Culture – Webb Gallery (Julie and Bruce Webb), Waxahachie, Texas, May 6, 2018 - August 26, 2018
- The Outsider Art Fair, New York, New York, January 17–20, 2019 – Sonia Dutton (daughter of Denis Dutton), Dutton Gallery, exhibited the drawings of two Texas artists, Richard Gordon Kendall and Frank Jones

== Extant works ==
- Bank of American Building at Christmas, by Kendall (circa 1995) (see Bank of America Center, Houston)
- Church, by Kendall (circa 1995)
- Untitled, Building with Clock, by Kendall (circa 1995)

== Family ==
Richard had a brother, Lindsey Kendell (né Lenius Kendell; 1926–1952) — who, as a private serving with the 55th Ordnance Ammunition Company of the 8th Army in North Korea during the Korean War — died from non-combat causes while serving with the 55th Ordnance Ammunition Company of the 8th Army in South Korea during the Korean War.

== See also ==
- Portrait of Richard Gordon Kendall, by Mary Lawton
