= Steve R. Allen =

American painter

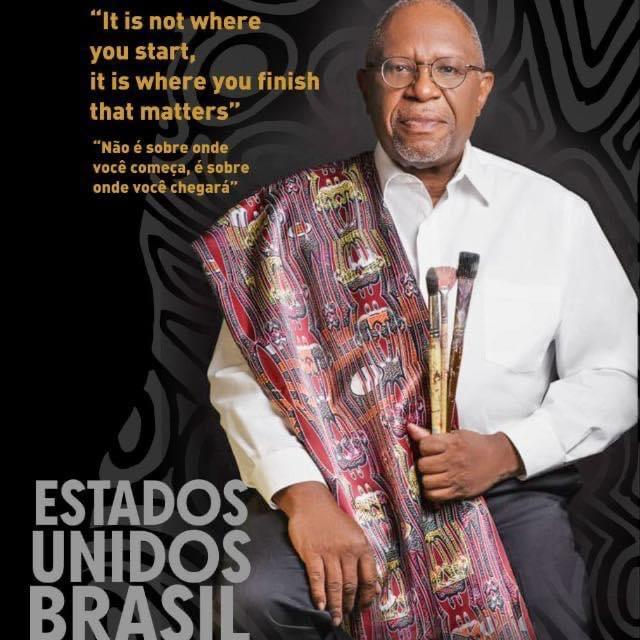
- Born: 1954 (age 71–72); Lillington, North Carolina
- Notable work: "Uniting Colors of the World" (1996)
- Website: steverallenfoundation.org

Steve Randall Allen: born 1954, is an American painter. Mr. Allen is known for his work as the Official Artist of the United States Olympic & Paralympic Committee, beginning with the 1996 Summer Olympics. In August 2021, Mr. Allen began a multi-million dollar initiative to donate selected artworks to Historically Black Colleges and Universities.

== Early life ==
Steve was born in North Carolina in a one-room home. He was studying to become an electrical engineer at the time and never showed much interest in anything beyond sketching. Though life and Steve's future had different plans, his initial intention was to work as a customer service representative for the IRS, VA, or another government agency.

His adventure, which was somewhat unexpected, started when he was 38 years old and chose to resign from his job because his employer, whom he calls "Mr. Charlie," wasn't speaking to him appropriately. He then immediately went to the unemployment office to confirm that he had funds in his account. That same afternoon, he began painting.

== Later Years ==
In 2021, a giving effort to help historically Black colleges and universities (HBCUs) was started by Allen. Five of his pieces, which are housed in the National Museum of African American History and Culture's Founding and Permanent Collection, were produced as "museum editions" as part of the project. Alongside the distribution of the pieces to a few HBCUs, there will be talks, symposiums, and debates on the art industry and increasing chances for black artists.

Allen said that his family's ties to Shaw University, where his mother attended, served as some of the fuel for the project. According to him, the initiative aims to provide students immediate access to original artwork and the opportunity to interact with a working artist.

In 2008, Allen established the Steve R. Allen Foundation. He has arranged art initiatives in the US as well as abroad, such as in Brazil and the Democratic Republic of the Congo, through the organization. Master seminars and educational programs aimed at inspiring young artists have been part of his outreach initiatives.

Allen has also talked openly about his early professional experiences, such as leaving his job as a copier technician to focus on painting full-time. He recognized the encouragement he had in the early years of his creative career from his mother and brother.
