= Reginald K. Gee =

American creative artist (born 1964)

Reginald Kevin Gee
- Born: April 28, 1964 (age 62); Milwaukee, Wisconsin, U.S.
- Occupations: Creative artist, writer and musiian
- Known for: Painting, fiction and non-fiction writing

Reginald K. Gee (born April 28, 1964) is a creative artist, writer and musician. Gee's brown paper bag series of paintings (1995–2002) were featured in a 25-year retrospective at the David Barnett Gallery.

== Early life ==
Reginald K Gee was born in 1964 in Milwaukee, Wisconsin and spent most of his childhood on the northwest side in the Havenwoods neighborhood. Gee is of African and Native-American (Blackfoot/Choctaw) descent. The youngest of three siblings. Gee's parents were from Mississippi, where his mother's family worked as sharecroppers. Gee's father, Hamilton R. Gee, was a World War II veteran who came to Milwaukee in the 1950s to work for International Harvester. Gee's mother, Ethel L. Gardner Gee, was a seamstress who retired from American Motors Corporation. Early in life, Gee exhibited his artistic talent at Byron Kilbourn Elementary School.

== Art career ==
Gee's professional art debut occurred February 1988 during an exhibition at the Dean Jensen Gallery in Milwaukee, Wisconsin.

Gee's subject matter includes jazz musicians, surreal landscapes, seascapes, romance, fantasy and social commentary. During the early 1990s, Gee's art was shown at the Baltimore Folk & Visionary Art Show, the New York Outsider Art Fair and the National Black Fine Art Show at the Puck Building in New York City. In 2002, two of Gee's paintings, “The Honest Crowd” and “Inspiration” were selected for the 2002 Smithsonian traveling exhibition In the Spirit of Martin: The Living Legacy of Dr. Martin Luther King Jr.. Another Gee painting, “Nationwide Tobacco Ban, © 1998", was chosen for a campaign against smoking sponsored by the American Lung Association.

In an August 11, 1999, interview with the Milwaukee Journal's art critic, James Auer, Gee talks about what inspires him to create: “The Visual Arts. Artist listens to his life's calling." During this interview, Gee speaks about the spiritual prophecy that had him move to San Francisco, start a ministry among the homeless and pursue the art career he started in Milwaukee. According to Contemporary American folk art: the Balsley Collection: "His paintings are figurative, abstract, surreal and narrative; they express, through the use of uninhibited color, the artist's views of contemporary society.” In this book, Gee is quoted as saying, “A good piece of art is like a splendid city. It will continually offer and you hardly receive the entirety." Upscale Magazine featured Gee in its April 2010 issue, "A Man Apart. Reginald Gee Draws Inspiration From The Human Experience".

== Literary work and continuing education ==
During a 2010–2015 hiatus from painting, Gee wrote two books: Concision Moments, a fictional culture wars novel (Tate Publishing & Enterprises, ISBN 1633674452) and A Drastic Observation: Salvation – Ours to Keep or Lose, a non-fictional trio of essays confronting religious spirits (Tate Publishing & Enterprises, ISBN 1682936619).

Reginald K. Gee has four degrees from Agape Love Bible College, Milwaukee, Wisconsin: in 2017, a Bachelor in Theology; in 2018, a Master in Christian Counseling; in 2019, a Doctorate in Theology; in 2020, a Doctorate in Divinity.
