= Joseph Clinton Devillis =

American painter

- Born: 1878; Brooklyn, New York
- Died: 1912 (aged 33–34)
- Education: Adelphi University
- Spouse: Grace Devillis

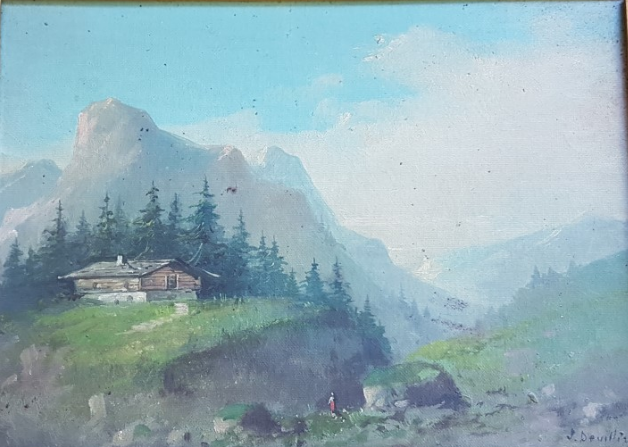
Cabin and Mountain Scene by Joseph Clinton Devillis

Joseph Clinton Devillis (aka De Villis) (1878–1912) was an African American artist from Brooklyn, New York who primarily painted landscapes and seascapes.

Devillis enlisted in the United States Navy in 1894 (with pad and pencils in hand). Upon visiting Europe he used his shore leave to study the masterpieces in the Louvre, Luxembourg and the galleries of London. An Apprentice First Class on Dewey's USS Olympia, in 1898 he was a signal man at the Battle of Manila Bay.

In 1901 he left the Navy and returned to New York where he was one of few African American Art students in New York at the time. He studied at the Adelphi College between 1907 and 1912, joining the Adelphi Sketch Club.

Devillis was also an active member of the Nazarene Congregational Church in Brooklyn where he was a Deacon and the Treasurer. He died of pneumonia in 1912 at the age of 33. His work was posthumously displayed at the New York Public Library in 1921 and formed part of the A.A. Schomburg Collection there.
