= Mary A. Bell =

African-American artist and illustrator

- Born: July 2, 1873; Washington, D.C., United States
- Died: September 20, 1941 (aged 68); Boston, United States
- Known for: Illustration
- Patrons: Gertrude Stein; Henry McBride; Florine Stettheimer

Mary A. Bell (July 2, 1873 – September 20, 1941) was a self-taught African-American artist and illustrator. She produced over 150 known works featuring mostly women of all classes and races in their daily lives. She was little known during her life, but became more prominent after a showcase of her art at Yale University in the 1980s.

== Early life ==
Bell was born on July 2, 1873, in Washington, D.C., to James F. Bell and Susanna County. She received no formal training in illustration, instead working various domestic jobs until her 60s.

In the 1920s, Bell worked as a domestic servant for Edward Peter Pierce, justice of the Massachusetts Supreme Judicial Court, as well as for the sculptor Gaston Lachaise and his wife, Isabel. During this time, Bell would spend her evenings in her room, drawing simple images, many of women. Isabel Lachaise described these drawings as "miracles" and recommended them to Bell's later patron Carl Van Vechten.

== Artistic career ==
In the mid-1930s, Bell left regular employment to focus on her artwork. She created over 150 known works between 1936 and 1939. Bell primarily worked in crayon and colored pencil on the type of tissue paper used in dressmaking. Her drawings were elegant scenes from the everyday life of the rich white women, as well as Creole or African-American subjects. Her subjects were often strong, powerful women, though if the subjects were of mixed race, her drawings maintained the social structure of the time, with the white subjects drawn in better clothing or otherwise more prominently.

Her artwork became known to the general public thanks to patrons such as author Gertrude Stein, writer and photographer Carl Van Vechten, publicist Mark Lutz, critic Henry McBride and artist Florine Stettheimer. Van Vechten alone commissioned roughly 100 drawings from Bell. Vechten included over 100 of her drawings in a donation of works by Black artists to Yale's Yale's Beinecke Library.

The first public showing of Bell's work occurred years after her death, in the 1980s, when two Yale graduate students, Mary Kordak and Theresa Leininger, ran across the illustrations during a University-wide survey of American drawings.

== Death ==
Troubled by mental illness, possibly schizophrenia, Bell was admitted to Boston State Hospital in 1940. She died in the hospital the following year from heart failure.

== Selected works ==
- The Lost Chord
- Oh, What Lovely Apples
- Gratitude
- Proposing
- American Mixtures of the Ethiopian Race
- Admiring the Birds
- Princess of the Forest
- Fear not, I am with you always
- Gentleness/Love in a Garden
- Delicate little mother putting the darlings to bed
- Piety
- The jungle Belle Africa
- Meet me in the shadows
- Unhappy
- Thinking it over
- The black beauty dancing girl
- East and West--Love at a distance
- The young mother
- The hunter's delight
- New Orleans. Octoroon beauty and her lover
- Seeing her lover in a vision, and thinking she may never see him again; it's breaking her little heart
- Through kingdoms and palaces we may roam, be it ever so humble, there is no place like home sweet home
- Beautiful Miss Paris
- Dancing in the lawn. A Lawn Party. Chocolate Cream.
- Lawdie, that gal done gone crazy
- Love's golden dream: Pleading
- Admiration of Ethiopian the immortal
- The setting sun
- Admiring each other's hair on the lawn
- This life is a puzzle
- The colored saint
- untitled (Spanish dancer?)
- Burlesque show on the stage
- Courtship is the finest ship that ever saled
- Sleeping
