= Joe Louis Light =

African-American painter

Joe Light
- Joe Light on his front porch outside of Memphis, Tennessee
- Born: Joe Louis Light; 1934; Dyersburg, Tennessee
- Died: 2005 (aged 70–71); Memphis, Tennessee
- Known for: Painting
- Movement: Modern Art

Joe Louis Light (1934–2005) was an American painter from Dyersburg, Tennessee. His work focuses on transcendentalism, attaining spiritual or moral enlightenment, and the balance and order of the universe.

Mr. Light first exhibited his paintings in the early 1990s at the former Wild Studio and Gallery. The gallery was located at 85 South Second street in Memphis Tn.

== Life ==
Joe Light grew up on a farm outside of Dyersburg, Tennessee with his mother, Virgie (Virgin) Mary, and father, Hiawatha. His parents named him after Joe Louis, a famous boxer and hero among the African American community during the Jim Crow Era.

He became estranged from his parents as a young boy and completed until the eighth at Brewer High School. He spent his youth farming until he enlisted in the army in March 1951. However, in August of that same year, he was discharged because, as he said, "I found out they were going to send me to Korea, so I hurt my arm." Shortly after leaving the military, he was imprisoned from 1954-55 for armed robbery of a grocery store. He was also imprisoned in the Nashville penitentiary from 1960–66 and 1966-68. During his first prison sentence, Light met a Rabbi and converted to Judaism. He recalled that hearing the Old Testament "was the first time something a preacher said ever made good sense to me."

Light was married twice. He married and had two children in his early twenties, but left that family before going to prison in 1960. After his release from prison in 1966, he traveled to various places in the southern mid-west courting women for marriage. According to Light's account, he traveled to Arkansas, Oklahoma, Kansas, Missouri, and Tennessee in search of a wife. He met Rosie Lee Cotton, and immediately after his second release from prison, he married her on September 1, 1968. Together they raised five sons and five daughters outside of Memphis, Tennessee. He is the father of rapper The Legend Lady J.

Light rented a booth at the local flea market as his main source of income. He re-purposed salvaged or vintage goods and sold them at the market. He never sold his paintings or signage there.

Light was an outspoken recluse. Although he rarely left his house or socialized with his neighbors, he maintained an almost Evangelical approach to spreading political justice and Old Testament-derived morality. "He [had] the fervor of a convert; he believed that he had the answers to solve the world's problems."

Light died on August 6, 2005, at age 70 and is buried in the West Tennessee State Veterans Cemetery.

== Career ==
Joe Light loosely began making art after his conversion to Judaism. As he traveled the southern mid-west searching for a wife, he began chalking and graffitiing moral codes and Old Testament verses on public spaces. Graffiti helped him develop his style of signage, which he used to proselytize his code of ethics. Once he married Rosie Lee Cotton and settled down into his home on Looney St. in Memphis in 1970, he used his home as his main base for communicating his messages. He took inspiration from his graffiti in the 1960s and began writing ethical and moral commands on the shutters and siding of his home.

=== Materials ===
Light used found driftwood from the Mississippi River for some of his sculptures. He used other found material such as old T.V. sets and hubcaps for his paintings and assemblages. Many of his paintings were produced with house paint on thin plywood.

=== Inspirations ===
Religion and his personal faith were Light's greatest inspirations. "Renouncing the Baptist Christianity of his youth, he developed a personal faith conditioned by the racial prejudice he experienced in the pre-civil rights era South, as well as suspicion toward Christianity’s effects on colonized peoples."

Aesthetically, Light was heavily influenced by pop art and commercialism of the mid-twentieth century. His paintings feature illustrative outlines of landscapes or portraits in black, filled in with bold, saturated, often monochrome colors. Some art historians argue that Light's iconic, pop art inspired painting style was influenced by his constant exposure to advertisements and branding while selling and refurbishing common wares at the market. His two inspirations, spirituality and commercialism combined often, such as in his piece Hobo # Birdman (1988) in which the recurring Hobo character is walking towards two commercially made postcards that have been inlaid into the painting. Another example is a painting that was documented inside Light's home of Pebbles and Bamm-Bamm, two characters from the prolific Flintstones cartoons, riding on a serpent through a garden.

=== Home ===
Before Light began making autonomous paintings and sculptures, he adorned his home with paintings and signs of his messages. On the outside, his home conveyed his beliefs clearly on race, politics, and spirituality for passersby. For those unfamiliar, Light spelled out his messages in clear, written English or bold narrative imagery, so as to make interpretation as easy as possible. This interpretation would have to be done by the outsiders themselves because Light rarely interacted with the public personally. He fortified his yard and home such that no one could enter without his discretion. "His yard is completely enclosed by fences. 'I don't want nobody coming in,' Light explains, but he really doesn't want anyone going out either."

Light was hyper-aware of the dangers that the outside world posed to his African American Jewish children. Since he bore the weight of racial, political, economic, and social injustice in his lifetime, he wanted to spare his children as much of that injustice as possible. Inside his home, he wrote messages on the walls in Arabesque script, which he referred to as "Abraham's language." His paintings on the inside of his house also became more abstract and difficult to discern an obvious theological narrative from. "Because he has had no human mentor to guide and advise him along his life's treacherous road, he serves as his own counsel, as a Moses illuminating the way, fighting the adversaries, and leading himself toward the Promised Land."

=== Recurring imagery ===
The Hobo and the Birdman appear as recurring folkloric images in Light's work. Both trace their origins to Light's journey to conversion and spiritual enlightenment. The Hobo represents an unenlightened person searching for meaning. Light has painted four versions of The Hobo, one black, one white, one red, and one yellow, in reference to his multi-cultural heritage. He situated the Hobo amidst nature, typically beside a river or mountain range, which represents the impasse that The Hobo must traverse to attain enlightenment.

The Birdman is the antithesis of the Hobo; he is the enlightened one. When Light first heard the voice of God calling him to Judaism, a bird flew into the window of his cell in the penitentiary. For Light, the bird has since been a symbol of divine intervention and of God himself. It is not uncommon to see the Hobo and the Birdman together in the same painting, as one must accompany the other on their spiritual journey.

== Exhibitions ==
- Outside the Mainstream: Folk Art in Our Time. 19 May- 12 Aug. 1988, High Museum of Art. Atlanta, GA.
- Ashe: Improvisation and Recycling in African-American Visionary Art. 2 Feb.- 29 Mar. 1993. Diggs Gallery - Winston-Salem State University. Winston-Salem, NC.
- Passionate Visions of the American South: Self- Taught Artists, 1940 to the Present. 23 Oct. 1993- 30 Jan. 1994 New Orleans Museum of Art. New Orleans, LA.
- Pictured in my Mind: Contemporary American Self-Taught Art from the Collection of Dr. Kurt Gitter and Alice Rae Yelen. 4 Feb.- 7 Apr 1996, Birmingham Museum of Art, Birmingham, AL.
- Wind in my Hair. 12 Oct 1996- 21 Apr 1997, American Visionary Art Museum. Baltimore, MD
- Noah's Ark: Animals by Southern Self-Taught Artists. 1 Aug- 19 Sep 1998. Art Museum of the University of Memphis. Memphis, TN.
- Let it Shine: Self-Taught Art from the T. Marshall Hahn Collection. 23 Jun. - 2 Sep. 2001. High Museum of Art. Atlanta, GA.
- Testimony: Vernacular Art of the African-American South. 15 Sep- 19 Nov. 2001. Kalamazoo Institute of Art. Kalamazoo, MI.
- Revelations: Art from the African American South. 3 Jun 2017- 1 Apr. 2018. De Young Museum. San Francisco, CA.
- History Refused to Die. 22 May- 23 Sept. 2018. Metropolitan Museum of Art. New York, NY.
- Called to Create: Black Artists of the American South. 18 Sept. 2022- 26 Mar. 2023. National Gallery of Art. Washington, DC.

== Permanent collections ==
- Fine Arts Museums of San Francisco
- Metropolitan Museum of Art
- High Museum of Art
- New Orleans Museum Of Art
- Rockford Art Museum
- Birmingham Museum of Art
- Milwaukee Art Museum
- Museum of Fine Arts Houston
- Gadsden Arts Center and Museum
- Ackland Art Museum
- Smithsonian American Art Museum.
- Speed Art Museum
