= Eugene Warburg =

American sculptor (1825–1859)

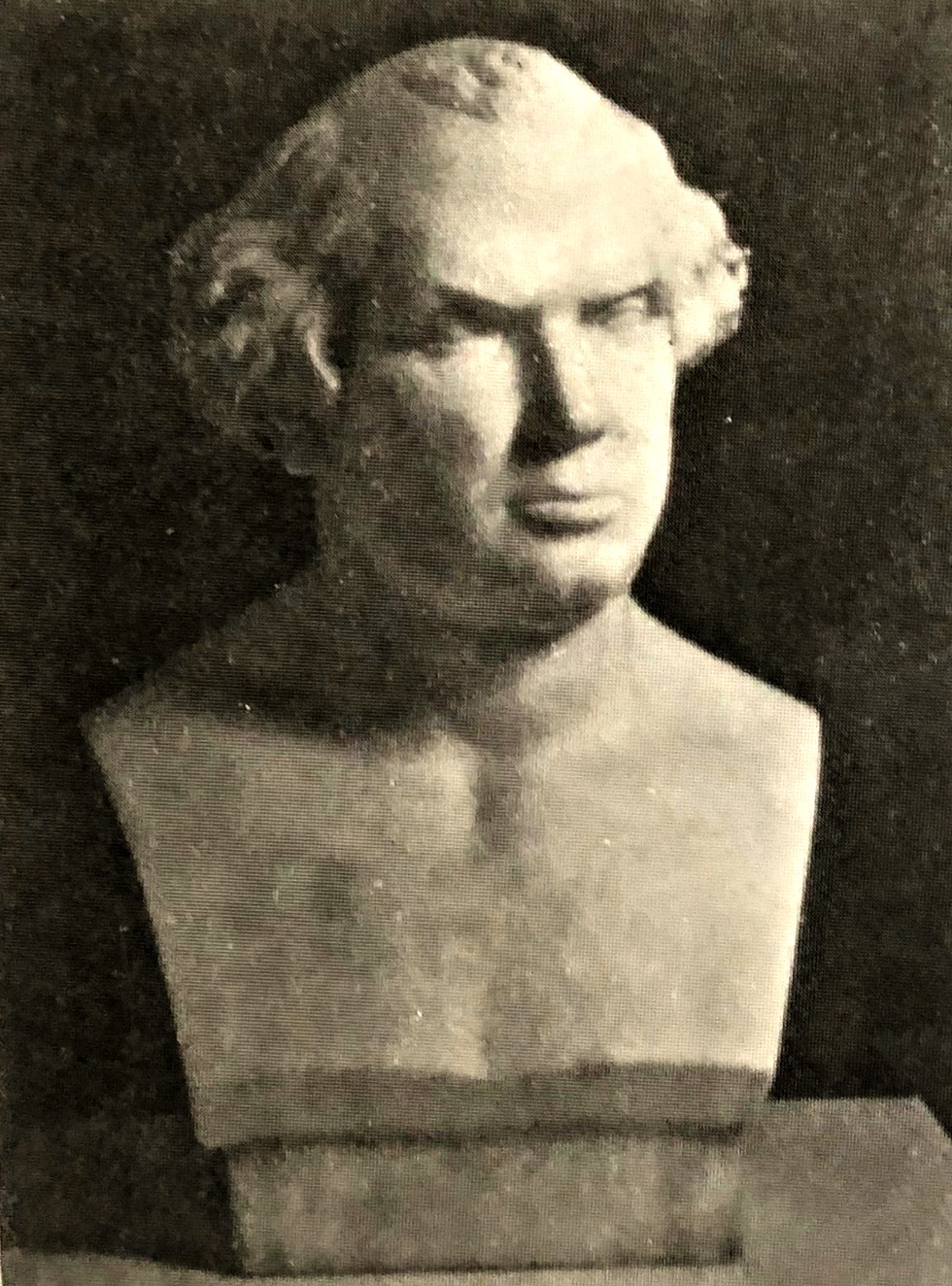
- Marble bust by Eugene Warburg, 1853
- Born: Joseph Eugene Warburg c. 1825; New Orleans, United States
- Died: January 12, 1859; Rome, Papal States (now Italy)

Eugene Warburg (c. 1825—1859) was an African-American sculptor. Born enslaved from birth in New Orleans in the mid-1820s, he was legally manumitted by his father, who was also his owner, at four years old. Warburg initially apprenticed as a marble cutter and later worked as a sculptor in New Orleans in the 1840s and early 1850s. He moved to Europe in 1853, where he worked as a successful sculptor until his death in 1859.

== Early life ==
Joseph Eugene Warburg, was born in New Orleans, Louisiana in late 1825 or possibly early 1826. His father, Daniel Warburg, was a Jewish emigrant from a prominent family in Hamburg, Germany. Warburg's mother was Daniel's mistress, Marie Rose Blondeau, a mixed-race enslaved woman from Santiago, Cuba. Blondeau's mother was also enslaved by Daniel Warburg. Marie Rose was given her freedom after Warburg's birth. Warburg was the oldest of his parents five children and was manumitted by his father when he was four years old. She died in 1837 at the age of 33, bequeathing three enslaved people to her five children.

== Career ==
Warburg was apprenticed to French artist, Phillippe Garbeille, as a marble cutter when he was a young man. While in his early twenties, Warburg established his own studio-workshop in the French Quarter. In the 1840s and early 1850s, Warburg received commissions to create portrait busts, religious statuary and gravestones. Most notably, he designed the floors for St. Louis Cathedral, the oldest cathedral in North America. (Warburg himself was a lifelong Catholic.)

In 1850, Warburg's bas-relief, Ganymede Offering a Cup of Nectar to Jupiter was exhibited for viewing and purchase in New Orleans for $500 (~$19,350 in 2025). The local newspaper, The New Orleans Bee, lavished praise on the young artist's work: "This exquisite specimen of sculpture", the work "by a young Creole of our city". the critic stated, "reflects infinite credit upon the taste and talent of our townsmen".

Increasing racial tensions, due possibly to jealousy from white artists in the community, caused Warburg to move to Paris. Before he left, Warburg filed a friendly lawsuit against his father to seek his share of the distribution of his mother's estate. His father, in turn, hosted a meeting with a notary public and six free men of color to speak on behalf of Warburg's siblings who were still minors. The participants voted unanimously to order the sale of the three slaves bequeathed to the children. Warburg's portion of his mother's estate was valued at $252.00. Not willing to wait for the distribution of the sale proceeds, Warburg selected his father to represent his interests, and sailed for Europe in November, 1852.

While studying and working in Paris from 1852 to 1856, Warburg was given letters of introduction to potential patrons by prominent Americans, including pro-slavery diplomat, John Young Mason who was the United States Ambassador to France. Warburg traveled to Belgium and England in 1856. He was encouraged and supported in his work by prominent American and British abolitionists, Harriet Beecher Stowe and Elizabeth Leveson-Gower, Duchess of Sutherland. In 1856, the Duchess of Sutherland commissioned a series of bas-reliefs from Warburg, based on the story of Uncle Tom's Cabin.

In 1857, with letters of introduction from Harriet Beecher Stowe and The Duchess of Suthereland, Warburg traveled to Italy, eventually settling permanently in Rome with his wife, Louise Ernestine. Warburg worked successfully as a sculptor in Rome for two years. His life was cut short, when he contracted an illness and died days later, on January 12, 1859.

== See also ==
- African-American Art
- Apprenticeship
- African Americans in France
