= Llanakila =

American painter

Victoria Brown, known by the alias Llanakila (La-Na-Key-Luh), is a Jamaican-American artist, painter, digital illustrator, and digital artist. Her work focuses on empowering Black women, often using bright, colorful lines to symbolize energy and magic. She describes exploring the "infinite possibilities of outer space," and creates work that would not be seen in people's lived, daily realities.

== Personal life ==
Born in Brooklyn, Llanakila became interested in art as a 7th grader living in Louisiana. Because of her family's military background, she attended over five high schools. Art became a way to express emotions when connecting with other classmates was difficult. Llanakila graduated from Pennsylvania State University in 2014 with a degree in printmaking. Wanting to expand her artistic practice, her skills in animation in video are self-taught.

She is the sister of photographer Nakeya Brown, whose Hair Stories Untold series went viral on Tumblr. The name Llanakila comes from a luau she attended in Hawaii, a place that greatly influenced her during a monthlong stay there. It is Hawaiian for "victorious," a play on her given name. She cites Kate Moross, Ruffmercy, Jean-Michel Basquiat, Shantell Martin, street art, hieroglyphics, West African spirituality, music, her sister, and herself as artistic inspirations.

== Career ==
=== Artistic philosophy ===
Black female identity is central to Llanakila's explorations as an artist. Her "work now glorifies Black women, in all shades, to love themselves and our unique powers as women. I'm always painting women because I am a woman and I think we are the most complex matter in this Universe." Bright colors and lines that evoke a sense of cosmic energy also feature prominently in her work. In order to create the lines she is known for, Llanakila "typically go[es] off of the energy of the subject in the photos or the way the photo was taken. These lines represent that. Some lines are diamonds, while others are flowers." She therefore seeks to demonstrate everyday womanhood as filled with energy, hyper-real, and otherworldly.

=== Music industry involvement ===
Llanakila currently works as a freelance artist for Atlantic Records and a graphic designer based out of Maryland and working in Washington, D.C. She has previously worked for Spotify as well as with numerous musicians. Hip-hop artists Big K.R.I.T.and Asher Roth have Llanakila paintings in their collections. She has designed promotional materials for artists like Justine Skye and BJ the Chicago Kid, as well as the official animation for Major Lazer's and Kickraux's remix of Kranium's "Nobody Has To Know" ft. Ty Dolla $ign.

=== Amber Rose SlutWalk ===
Llanakila's art was featured in the 2015 Amber Rose SlutWalk in Los Angeles, California. Llanakila stated that, "I love what Amber Rose is saying in her Slut Walk. The American language can be divided, gender-specific, and misogynistic with words like Slut, Hoe, Thot, etc. It's ridiculous. I'm about empowering women and embracing our nudity, sexuality, and sexual freedom." Three pieces were selected to be put on display: shed your skin. there's a new start with each sunrise., a piece from the We Love What We Got series, and Free Spirit.
