= Gus Nall =

American painter

- Born: 1919; Chicago, Illinois, United States
- Died: 1995 (aged 75–76)
- Occupations: Artist and Painter
- Spouse: Thelma Nall

Gus Nall (1919–1995) was an American painter during the mid-20th century in Chicago, Indiana, Ohio, and Michigan. Born in Illinois, Nall’s most known work is his painting "Lincoln Speaks to Freedmen on the Steps of the Capital at Richmond" (1963), which was commissioned by the state of Illinois in honor of the 100th anniversary of the Emancipation Proclamation.

== Life ==
Gus Nall was an African-American painter born in Chicago, Illinois in 1919. He was married to Thelma Nall at the age of twenty-one. Nall was a notable artist during the 1950s and 60s, known for his modernist representation of African Americans. He studied at the Art Institute of Chicago and as well as in Paris. During his life, he was featured in Art Gallery Magazine (1968, "The Afro-American Issue") as well as Carol Myers' Black Power in the Arts.

== Work ==
Nall’s work consisted of elongated human figures influenced by Cubist and Expressionist styles of painting, and African art. His art most often portrays representations of African Americans. He was influenced by Archibald Motley and Eldzier Cortor, who were fellow artists from Chicago. Nall’s work allowed him to become a role model to fellow painters as well as those interested in his life as an artist. Nall had an inspiring effect on the life of fellow artist and writer Clarence Major who looked up to him. His painting "Lincoln Speaks to Freedmen on the Steps of the Capital at Richmond" (1963) is on permanent exhibit in the DuSable Museum of African American History.

== Gallery ==
Gus Nall’s Paintings
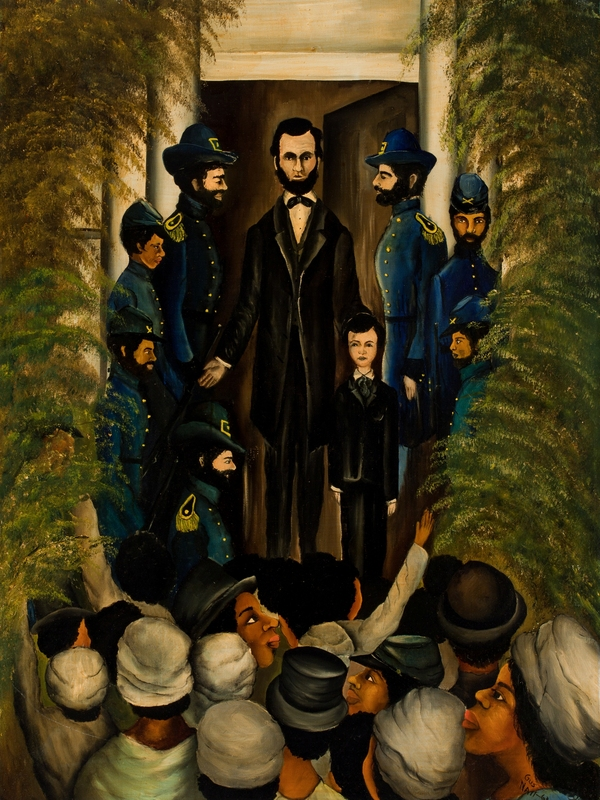
"Lincoln Speaks to Freedmen on the Steps of the Capital at Richmond" by Gus Nall
