= Donté K. Hayes =

American ceramicist (born 1975)

- Born: 1975 (age 49–50); Baltimore, Maryland, U.S.
- Education: Kennesaw State University; University of Iowa
- Known for: Ceramicist
- Partner: ,
- Website: dontekhayes.com

Donté K. Hayes (born 1975, Baltimore, Maryland) is an American artist known for his ceramic sculpture. He studied at Kennesaw State University and the University of Iowa. In 2019 Hayes was named Ceramics Monthly magazine's emerging artist. The same year, he won the Society 1858 prize for contemporary Southern art from the Gibbes Museum of Art. His work is in the collection of Museum of Fine Arts, Houston. His piece, Initiate, was acquired by the Smithsonian American Art Museum as part of the Renwick Gallery's 50th Anniversary Campaign.
