= Elenora "Rukiya" Brown =

American artist

- Born: Elenora Brown; 1952 (age 73–74); Chicago, Illinois
- Known for: Mixed-media, textile art
- Notable work: I am the First Gold the First Diamond, I am the Living Earth; White Bison; Winds of Change; Uprooted: Look up, Hold on
- Website: https://rukiyabrowngallery.com/about/

Elenora "Rukiya" Brown (born 1952) is an African American mixed-media and textile artist born in Chicago, Illinois, and based in New Orleans, Louisiana. She has Choctaw heritage. In 2013, she became Queen of the Creole Wide West Tribe in New Orleans. She specializes in handmade clay dolls, quilts, and performance suits created for the masking tradition of the Mardi Gras Indians. In 2021, she was an Artist-in-Residence at the Joan Mitchell Center. Her work explores themes related to her African and Choctaw descent, as well as her personal healing process after Hurricane Katrina.

== Early life ==
Brown spent much of her childhood in Chicago, Illinois. Her passion for doll making began at a young age, which emerged as both a form of creative self-expression and stress relief. She often went to Garfield Park to gather natural materials for her creations, such as dirt, tree branches, and acorn seeds. Additionally, she was a member of a club that taught young girls how to make dolls and their clothes and shoes by hand. She went to dry-cleaning school, and learned to sew on her sister's sewing machine. During holidays spent with her grandmother in Louisiana, she developed her sewing skills and learned beading techniques.

A traumatic event led her to move to New Orleans in 1969, and she left the United States soon after and put her doll making on pause for several years while she lived in the United Kingdom. Upon her return in 1995, she worked in the fashion industry—dressing mannequins and becoming a Fashion Buyer for fashion retailers—and resumed her creation of dolls.

== Career ==
Brown's works were first displayed at the Congo Square African Marketplace of the New Orleans Jazz and Heritage Festival and the Essence Music Festival. When her dolls were initially sold to the public in the 1990s, they were made from fabric, stuffed, and faceless. In 2005, the artist developed her new doll making technique; referred to as "soft sculptures," these dolls' faces and bodies are entirely hand-sculpted from clay.

Brown's first soft sculptures collection, Winds of Change, was created in 2005 after her survival of Hurricane Katrina, and responds to what the artist perceives as a second Great Migration that New Orleans experienced as a result of the natural disaster. Other notable collections of hers include Uprooted: Look up, Hold on (2006), comprising 100 new dolls made as a message of resilience for other survivors; Unclaimed Memories (2007), created to pay homage to community members whose bodies remained in the morgue after the hurricane; and Swimming to the Top of the Rain (2008), which was exhibited in the 2008 African American Fine Art Show Chicago and celebrated the progress both her and New Orleans had made to rebuild in the three years since Katrina. She has also exhibited her work at the Stella Jones Gallery in New Orleans. In 2022, The Colored Girls Museum in Philadelphia acquired one of her soft sculptures.

The artist created her first performance suit, Metamorphosis, for the carnival season in 2012. She constructs her celebratory costumes from a variety of fabrics as well as other materials that are hand-sewn on, such as small beads, ribbons, brooches, and marabou bird feathers. Using these materials, she depicts cultural motifs from both Black and Native American traditions. Her suits When Black People Could Fly (2014), I am the First Gold the First Diamond, I am the Living Earth (2015), and The White Buffalo Calf Woman (2017) are held in the collections of the New Orleans Museum of Art, Ohio State University Libraries, and the Musée du Quai Branly - Jacques Chirac, respectively.

Her mixed-media work, Awakening Metamorphosis (2014), is part of the Imago Mundi Collection in Treviso, Italy. Her art has also been featured in the 2014 book Artist Spaces, New Orleans.
