= Mitchell Squire =

Mitchell Squire (born 1958) is an American installation artist, sculptor, and performance artist. He was born in Natchez, Mississippi. He primarily focuses on exploring culture through acquired artifacts and the inability to express pain. Squire is currently a professor at Iowa State University and lives in Ames, Iowa. His work is held in the collections of the Minneapolis Institute of Art.

Regarding Squire's "Gladiators" exposition, the Minneapolis Institute of Art wrote:

From afar, the large, striking lithograph seems to depict a collection of elegant translucent perfume bottles. Upon closer inspection, the black silhouettes reveal themselves as law enforcement targets—faceless black male torsos—in an arbitrary pile suggestive of a mass grave, the bodies too numerous to count.

Another installation features a law enforcement paper gun range targets riddled with bullet holes.

Squire has a B.A. in architecture and M.Arch. from Iowa State University.

== Exhibition history ==
=== Solo exhibitions ===
- 2014 - Bemis Center for Contemporary Arts, Mitchell Squire: We're gonna have to do more than talk | Carver Bank, 11 January - 29 March
- 2012 - London, White Cube Gallery, Mitchell Squire: Inside the White Cube, 7 September - 11 November
- 2011 - New York, CUE Art Foundation, Mitchell Squire: no 'nother country, 19 November - 14 January 2012 (catalogue)
- 2010 - Berkeley, University of California, Berkeley, Wurster Gallery, Mitchell Squire, TOYZ: and other thoughtful objects for hours of play, 17 November - 3 December
- 2009 - Ann Arbor, University of Michigan, Taubman College Gallery, Mitchell Squire, TOYZ: and other thoughtful objects for hours of play, 15 February - 29 March
- 2005 - Des Moines, Drake University, Anderson Gallery, Mitchell Squire: Still Life with Peaches (and a little black boy atop a spotted pony), 10 November - 11 December

=== Group exhibitions ===
- 2011 - New York, New Museum, Museum as Hub: Alpha's Bet Is Not Over Yet, 12 October - 4 December

== Select collections ==
- Des Moines Art Center
- Minneapolis Institute of Art

== Editioned prints ==
- Gladiators, 2013 Mitchell Squire; Publisher: World House Editions, Middlebury, Conn., Lithograph The Barbara S. Longfellow fund for works on Paper 2014.26

== Residencies ==
- 2010 - Skowhegan School of Painting and Sculpture, Maine

== Awards ==
- 2010 - Midwestern Voices and Visions award; Alliance of Artists Communities
- 2009 - ACSA Creative Achievement Award: Course "Craft and Crafty Action: On The Relationship Between Creativity and Mischief"
- 2005 - Association of Collegiate Schools of Architecture (ACSA) New Faculty Teaching Award
