= Charles Sebree =

American painter and playwright

- Born: 1914; Madisonville, Kentucky
- Died: 1985 (aged 70–71); Washington, DC
- Education: Chicago Art Institute and the Chicago School of Design

Charles Sebree (1914–1985) was an American painter and playwright best known for his involvement in Chicago's black arts scene of the 1930s and 1940s.

== Early life and education ==
Sebree spent his early childhood in White City, located in eastern Kentucky. In 1924, his mother moved to Chicago, Illinois, which exposed Sebree to a wide range of artistic influences. One of his drawings as a young boy was bought by the Renaissance Society for twenty-five dollars and ended up being featured on their magazine cover. After attending the Art Institute of Chicago, Sebree remained there and became involved with a group of artists centered in Chicago's South Side.

== Career ==
Chicago's black arts movement came to rival the vibrancy seen in New York's Harlem Renaissance, and Sebree benefited from connections with artists such as Margaret Taylor-Burroughs and Eldzier Cortor, as well as the network of support created through affiliations with such institutions as the South Side Community Arts Center and the Art Institute.

Sebree was very interested in the theater, working as a playwright, director, and set designer. His painted portraits tended primarily to feature performers, frequently harlequins and saltimbanques. These works show a strong Modernist influence, specifically recalling the expressive faces and figures seen in the portraits of Picasso and Modigliani, while also referencing his interest in Byzantine icons.

Between 1936 and 1938, Sebree worked for the New Deal's Works Progress Administration (WPA). In 1942, his career was briefly interrupted when he was drafted into World War II. He was stationed at Camp Robert Smalls, a segregated section of the Great Lakes Naval Training base, north of Chicago. While there, he met the playwright Owen Dodson, who would become a close friend and artistic collaborator. Together, they produced several plays at Camp Smalls, including the “Ballad of Dorrie Miller,” which was dedicated to a black naval mess attendant who saved the lives of several of his shipmates at Pearl Harbor.

After the war, Sebree moved to New York, where he once again found a community of artists, as he had in Chicago. His circle in New York included artists such as Billie Holiday and Billy Strayhorn. He was the recipient of a fellowship from the Julius Rosenwald Fund in 1945, and went on to co-write the successful 1954 Broadway musical, "Mrs. Patterson," which starred Eartha Kitt. Sebree moved to Washington, DC in the 1947, where he lived until his death from cancer in 1985.

== Works ==
Plays

- My Mother Came Crying Most Pitifully (1949)
- Mrs Patterson (1954)
- Dry August (1972)
