= Percy Martin (artist) =

American artist and teacher

- Born: Honolulu, Hawaii, United States
- Occupations: Artist, retired art teacher
- Known for: Allegorical printmaking

Percy Martin is an American artist and teacher. Martin has lived in Washington, D.C. since 1947 and has taught several generations of Washington area art students, including the University of Maryland, the Corcoran School of the Arts and Design and finally at the Sidwell Friends School, where he taught from 1979 to 2009.

== Education ==
Martin studied art and graduated from the Corcoran School of the Arts and Design.

== Artwork ==
For over three decades, Martin has been working on a series of technical prints which detail the life, culture and history of an imaginary Bushmen people born out of Martin's imagination.

Scenes from the Bushworld play out in Martin's mind as sharply as a movie. The most mundane objects can send him into a cross-dimensional corkscrew. While vacationing in the Ukraine in 1995, for instance, he picked up a smooth, oval stone on a river bank and immediately fell into a quasi-hallucination wherein angry Bushwomen were trying to crack a sacred bird's stone egg with a crystal egg to become High Priestess. "If I could've gotten a jet helicopter, I would've left that second," says Martin.

His work is in the collection of the Smithsonian American Art Museum, The Washington Post, the City of Washington, DC, and the University of Maryland, and has been exhibited widely in galleries, museums, universities, and arts organization such as the Washington Project for the Arts.

== Awards ==
Martin was awarded a Ford Foundation Fellowship in 1966, and nine years later, in 1975 he was also awarded a National Endowment for the Arts Artist-in-Residence award.
