= Eldzier Cortor =

American painter (1916– 2015)

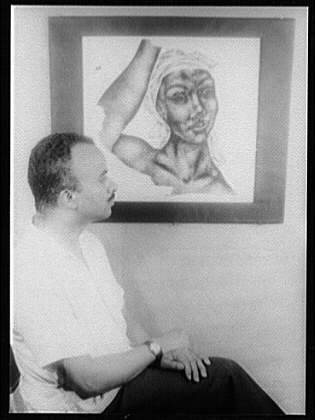
- Cortor in 1959
- Born: January 10, 1916; Richmond, Virginia, U.S.
- Died: November 26, 2015 (aged 99); Long Island, New York, U.S.
- Education: Art Institute of Chicago
- Known for: Painting

Eldzier Cortor (January 10, 1916 – November 26, 2015) was an American artist and printmaker. His work typically features elongated nude figures in intimate settings, influenced by both traditional African art and European surrealism. He is known for his style of realism that makes accurate depictions of poor, Black living conditions look fantastic as he distorts perspective.

== Early life and education ==
Cortor was born on January 10, 1916, in Richmond, Virginia, to John and Ophelia Cortor. His family moved to Chicago when Cortor was about a year old, eventually settling in that city's South Side, where Cortor attended Englewood High School. His family was a part of the Great Migration of African Americans from the South to the industrial North. Fellow students at Englewood included the African-American artists Charles Wilbert White and Margaret Burroughs. Cortor attended the Art Institute of Chicago, along with artist Gus Nall, gaining a degree in 1936. While at the Art Institute, he studied its collections extensively and grew an appreciation for traditions of Western Painting. Studying the African sculptures at an exhibit at the Field Museum transformed his work. He said "That was the most important influence in all my work, for to this day you will find in my handling of the human figure that cylindrical and lyrical quality I was taught...to appreciate in African art."

Growing up, Cortor was an avid reader of the Chicago Defender, which was a popular newspaper that focused on celebrating the successes of African Americans. He also had success in white publications and was featured in the Chicago Tribune in 1939 due to his involvement in the South Side Community Art Center. This is ultimately translated into the main thematic focus of his artwork, which is to portray African Americans in a positive light and highlight their beauty and achievements. For the majority of his career, Cortor played with different representations of the black female figure and how to represent her strength and beauty. Cortor saw Black women as the carriers of Black culture. His style is often described as experimenting with black physiognomy while infusing it with surrealism.

== Career ==
In 1940, Cortor worked with the Works Progress Administration (WPA), where he drew scenes of Depression-era Bronzeville, a neighborhood on Chicago's South Side. Cortor often painted intimate scenes of the home. These surreal works emphasis the subject's role in society and relationship to the outer world. In 1949, he studied in Jamaica, Cuba, and Haiti on a Guggenheim Fellowship, and taught at the Centre d'Art in Port-au-Prince from 1949 to 1951.

In 1944 and 1945, Cortor won the Julius Rosenwald Foundation Fellowships consecutively, which allowed him to travel to the Sea Islands off the coast of Georgia and South Carolina. The Gullah people resided in these islands and Cortor was particularly interested in this area because of how untouched their culture had been by white people and American culture. In this regard, he decided to explore a different African diasporic culture that had more African elements prevalent overall in their culture. He spent two years living on the islands and immersed himself into the Gullah culture. "As a Negro artist I have been particularly concerned with painting Negro racial types not only as such but in connection with particular problems in color, design and composition…I have felt an especial interest in…painting Negroes whose cultural traditions had been only slightly influenced by whites…I should like to…paint a series of pictures which would reflect the particular physical and racial characteristics of the Gullahs." Cortor incorporated hints of traditional Africanisms within his art during his stay at the Gullah Islands. He would paint individuals with elongated necks, arms, legs, and faces. This elongation was a tribute to traditional African sculptures which often incorporated this elongation. Cortor through his time with the Gullah people, became passionate about the beauty of African Women, which he referenced in many of his paintings. He painted black women in a way to encapsulate their beauty, he wanted to bring light to the beauty of black women. He went against the beauty standards of his, as white, Eurocentric standards were the standard. Cortor rebelled against this standard, as he painted black women in a surrealistic style, surrealism being very common is Europe, this showed deep skin tones are just as beautiful as white skin tones. He painted black woman as he believed the black woman represented the black race as a whole he once stated, "“The Black woman represents the Black race. She is the Black spirit. She conveys a feeling of eternity and a continuance of life.”"

Through Cortor's life his style varied wildly, he shifted from surrealism to print making and many other mediums. This changed in style could be attributed to the many places he traveled to and the vastly differing experiences he had. As well as to his desire to always learn new techniques and styles from the places he visited. Cortor expressed in an interview through Bomb Magazine, that he often enjoyed changing his art style, and that he was proud of how his art style had evolved and shifted over the course of his very lengthy career. When an artists begins creating works in childhood and continues through their entire life it is highly likely the art style would change.

== Death ==
Eldzier Cortor died on November 26, 2015, aged 99.

== Works ==
Cortor was one of the first African-American artists to make African-American women his dominant theme, explaining, "the Black woman represents the Black race, continuance of life." His treatment of women has been criticized, for instance in a 1985 article in Art, which described the figure in Southern Gate (1942–43) as, "Stripped of integrity and reduced to a mere object…" According to Adrienne Childs, Cortor's Cuban Souvenir "presents an exoticized black woman whose red dress, red lips…evoke the stereotypical notion of the Latin female sexuality." (Childs 1998: 122).

Melvin Edwards mentions Cortor as an example of an African-American artist influenced by surrealism, "who often uses the female figure in a surreal interior and exterior environment."

Cortor is considered to be the first African American artists to depict nude women as the central theme of his work. This was an unpopular choice for many artists at the time as a reaction to the dominant European and American cultural landscape at the time (Farrington 2004: 20). This was also unfavored because of the historical legacy of the sexual exploitation of black women during slavery. Cortor refutes these notions by showing the nude black female body as a source of strength. Cortor also believed that the black woman conveys a sense of eternity and continuance of life (Jennings 1988:, 47). An example of this is Cortor's famous painting named Southern Gate, which is illustrated in Figure 2. The central figure to this painting is a young, naked black woman. The background of the painting is very dark; the gate is in ruins and the clouds are indicative of a storm. Immediately behind the woman, there are less clouds and more light, which illuminates her figure. The woman also has a flower in her hair and a bird on her shoulder, perhaps indicating the dawn of a new day. The figure in the painting stands stall, giving an overall sense of a triumphant figure still standing throughout the crumbling ruins and the resilience of black women in general (Dallow 2004:98).

Cortor's 1948 work The Room No. VI was produced after Cortor's time at the WPA creating portraits of people in Bronzeville. Cortor wanted to depict the living conditions in these poor, Black areas of Chicago in a way that was not exploitative of their poverty. The figures in the work have long, exaggerated bodies reminiscent of those in Africans sculpture. While these bodies are very thin with visible ribs, this sign of poverty adds to the graceful lines of the work. Cortor conveys the small size of the room through flattening the image and placing objects almost on top of on another with conflicting lines of perspective. These clashing patterns evoke the African American quilting tradition which continues Cortor's dedication to depicting the beauty of Black culture. The four bodies create circular eye movement around the work. The vertical lines of the figures, wall paper, and wood-stove are contrasted by diagonal floor boards and horizontal patterns. This composition confuses the viewer's sense of space which adds a surreal quality to the piece. This painting depicts poverty without demanding the viewer's pity and gives its subject dignity and grace. Starting in the 1950s, Cortor became further inspired by African sculptures. In these works, one can see that he works more with cylindrical, graceful and elongated limbs. This is evident through Cortor's painting Dance Composition No. 31, which was produced in 1978 as a part of a series. It is seen as a reflection of his time that he spent with the Gullah people. In this painting, he evokes basketry and dance, which were two activities considered essential to the Gullah people. The swirling lines and the subtle incorporation of vibrant colors implies a sense of visual movement of the dancers (Bearden 1993: 57). The women's faces’ are depicted like sculptures, giving them a marble feel within the painting, referencing African art along with the decorative patterning. The sculptural women are also conveyed with a sense of peacefulness. This shows how important basket weaving and dancing are to the Gullah people and their culture. This work is a prime example of the importance of depicting Black culture to Cortor's work. Black women are shown as the harbingers of these traditions, and their physical beauty is an extension of their cultural beauty.

Another example of this subtle shift in Cortor's work is a painting of his named Classical Study No. 34 which was created in 1968 and also a part of a different series. In this painting, the woman is resting her head on her hand in a profile representation. Cortor plays with her features and makes them rather elongated, which gives a sculptural feel to the subject. She is also wearing a red, yellow and green scarf which is symbolic of the Pan-African flag, which pays homage to her African roots. The figure also resembles ancient marble sculptures, which were used in the past to celebrate someone. This painting is representative of celebrating the beauty and strength of black women, while emphasizing her African roots.

Eldzier Cortor was well known for his prints. Two of these prints being L'Abbatoire No. III and L'Abbatoire No.I. Cortor mainly used the intaglio printing process, however during the 1950s made several woodblock prints with Japanese printmaker Jun’ichiro Sekino. Woodblock printing is a form of relief printing where the parts that are not to be printed are simply cut out. L'Abbatoire was made with acid to etch the designs and Cortor used formaldehyde to prevent mold from growing on the work. These two materials are very reflective of the tone of these prints. The French word L’Abbatoire translates to a slaughterhouse in English. He was inspired to make the L’Abbatoire series by his experiences in Haiti when several of his friends were killed by François “Papa Doc” Duvalier's dictatorial regime. He based the imagery on a slaughterhouse that he had visited while he was there. The gore is symbolic of the brutality of humanity. Looking closely, you can see hooks chains within the paintings, as well as a furnace on the right indicating a slaughterhouse. The print on the left is reminiscent of rotting meat whereas the print on the right seems slightly less grotesque. I believe this is intentional as the print on the left was made about ten years later and is reflective of how the event had been festering in Cortor's mind. On the right there appears to be human figures burning in the background. It is possible that these figures are symbolic of his friends. Both pictures include vague outlines of carcasses, and specifically within L'Abbatoire No. III, you can see what looks like ribs, a skull, and various other bones.

== Exhibitions and collections ==
Cortor exhibited in the 1938 interracial show "An Exhibition in Defense of Peace and Democracy", which was sponsored by the Chicago Artists' Group. In 1940 he was one of the young artists exhibited at "The Exhibition of the Art of the American Negro" in Chicago. He also contributed to the 1967 City College of New York exhibition "The Evolution of Afro-American Artists: 1800 - 1950". In 1976 his painting Interior was included in the Los Angeles County Museum of Art exhibition "Two Centuries of Black American Art", curated by David Driskell, which toured the U.S. in 1977. The 1988 group exhibition "Three Masters", at New York's Kenkeleba Gallery, featured Cortor's work alongside that of Hughie Lee-Smith and Archibald Motley. Michael Brenson, in The New York Times review of the show, expressed a preference for Cortor's still-life paintings, rather than his paintings of people. The solo show "Eldzier Cortor: Master Printmaker" was exhibited at the Boston Psychoanalytic Society and Institute in 2002. In 2010 his works were included in an exhibition at the Library of Congress, and a selection of his works on paper exhibited at the Indiana University Art Museum. In 2013 Cortor's prints were featured in an exhibition at the San Antonio Museum of Art

His works are held in the collections of Howard University, the Smithsonian American Art Museum and The Art Institute of Chicago, among others.

== Awards and Fellowships ==
- Recipient Bertha A. Florsheim award Art Institute Chicago, 1945; recipient William H. Bartels award, 1946, Carnegie Institute award, 1947; Julius Rosenwald fellow, Chicago, 1945–47; John Simon Guggenheim fellow, New York City, 1949–50.
