= Alvin Hollingsworth =

American painter and comic book artist (1928–2000)

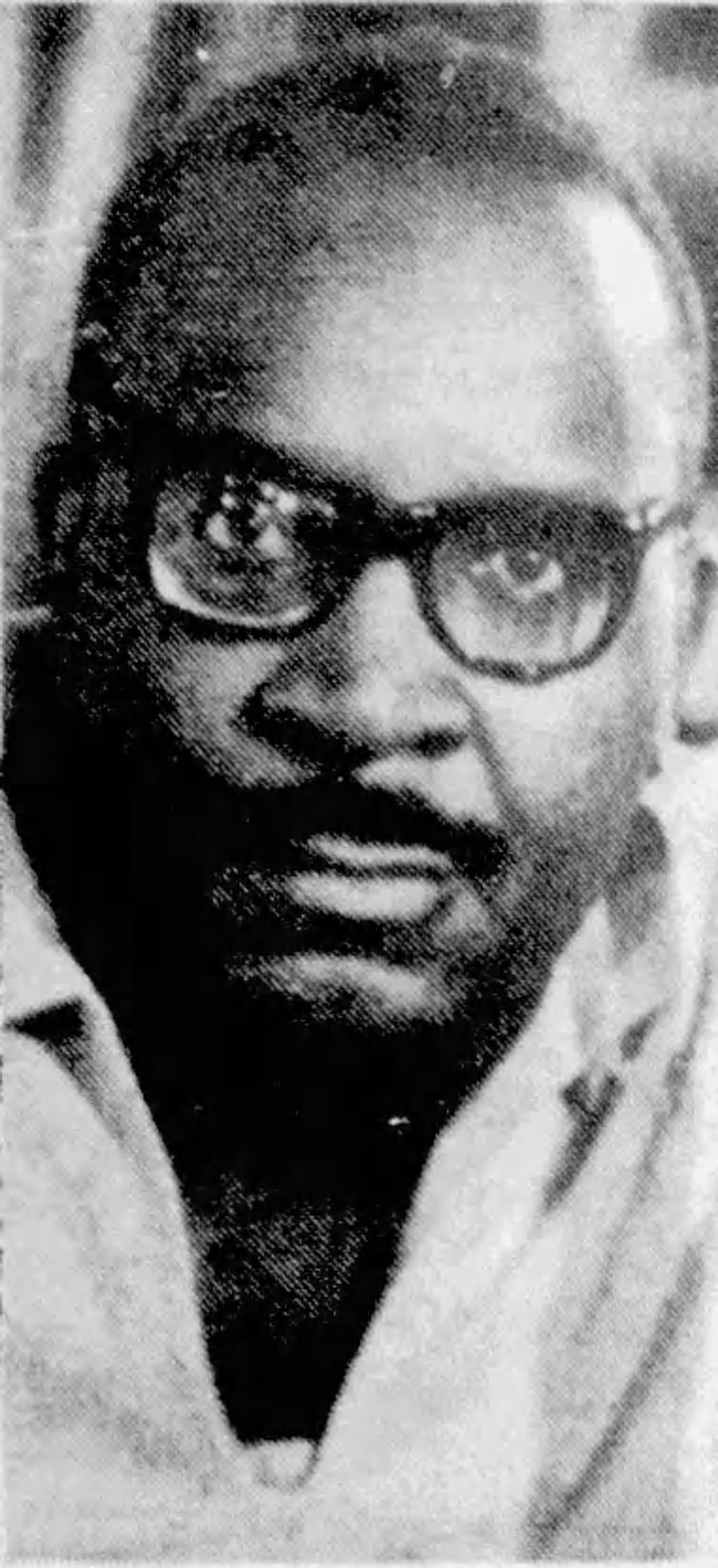
- Hollingsworth in 1977
- Born: Alvin Carl Hollingsworth; February 25, 1928; Harlem, New York City, New York
- Died: July 14, 2000 (aged 72)
- Other names: A. C. Hollingsworth, Al Hollingsworth, Alvin Holly
- Education: City College of New York
- Occupations: Comic-book artist, painter, art professor
- Known for: One of comics' first African-American artists, co-organizer of The Spiral (artist participants in 1963 March on Washington)

Alvin C. Hollingsworth (February 25, 1928 – July 14, 2000), whose pseudonyms included Alvin Holly, was an American painter, educator, and one of the first Black artists in comic books.

== Early life and comics ==
Alvin Carl Hollingsworth was born in Harlem, New York City, New York, of West Indian parents, and began drawing at age 4. By 12 he was an art assistant on Holyoke Publishing's Cat-Man Comics. Attending The High School of Music & Art, he was a classmate of future comic book artist and editor Joe Kubert.

Circa 1941, he began illustrating for crime comics. Since it was not standard practice during this era for comic-book credits to be given routinely, comprehensive credits are difficult to ascertain; Hollingsworth's first confirmed comic-book work is the signed, four-page war comics story "Robot Plane" in Aviation Press' Contact Comics #5 (cover-dated March 1945), which he both penciled and inked. Through the remainder of the 1940s, he confirmably drew for Holyoke's Captain Aero Comics (as Al Hollingsworth), and Fiction House's Wings Comics, where he did the feature "Suicide Smith" at least sporadically from 1946 to 1950. He is tentatively identified under the initials "A. H." as an artist on the feature "Captain Power" in Novack Publishing's Great Comics in 1945.

In the following decade, credited as Alvin Hollingsworth or A. C. Hollingsworth, he drew for a number of publishers and series, including Avon Comics' The Mask of Dr. Fu Manchu; Premier Magazines' Police Against Crime; Ribage's romance comic Youthful Romances; and such horror comics as Master Comics' Dark Mysteries and Trojan Magazine's Beware. As Al Hollingsworth, he drew at least one story each for Atlas Comics, Premier Magazines, and Lev Gleason Publications. One standard source credits him, without specification, as an artist on stories for Fox Comics (the feature "Numa" in Rulah, Jungle Goddess, and "Bronze Man' in Blue Beetle) and on war stories for the publisher Spotlight.

Historian Shaun Clancy, citing Fawcett Comics writer-editor Roy Ald as his source, identified Hollingsworth as an artist on Fawcett's Negro Romance #2 (Aug. 1950).

Hollingsworth graduated from City College of New York in 1956, Phi Beta Kappa, as a fine arts major, and earned his master's degree there in 1959. In the mid-1950s, while still a student, he worked on newspaper comic strips including Kandy (1954-1955) from the Smith-Mann Syndicate, as well as Scorchy Smith (1953-1954) and, with George Shedd, Marlin Keel (1953-1954).

During the 1960s, Hollingsworth taught illustration at the High School of Art & Design in Manhattan.

== Fine art career ==
Hollingsworth left comics for a career as a fine art painter. From 1980 until retiring in 1998 he taught art as a professor at Hostos Community College of the City University of New York. As a painter, his subjects included such contemporary social issues as civil rights for women and African Americans, as well as jazz and dance. Of one subject he painted, an African Jesus Christ, he told Ebony magazine in 1971, "I have always felt that Christ was a Black man," and said the subject represented a "philosophical symbol of any of the modern prophets who have been trying to show us the right way. To me, Malcolm X and Martin Luther King are such prophets." An authority on fluorescent paint, he worked in both representational and abstract art.

In the summer of 1963, Hollingsworth and fellow African-American artists Romare Bearden and William Majors formed the group Spiral in order to help the Civil Rights Movement through art exhibitions. At some point during the 1960s, he directed an art program teaching young students commercial art and fine art at the Harlem Parents Committee Freedom School. Examples of Hollingsworth's work are held in the permanent collections of the Smithsonian National Museum of African American History and Culture, the Hudson River Museum, the Brooklyn Museum, and the Harvey B. Gantt Center for African-American Arts+Culture, in Charlotte, North Carolina. His work is also held in numerous academic, corporate and private collections.

== Personal life ==
Hollingsworth was married to wife Marjorie, and had children Kim, Raymond, Stephen, Kevin, Monique, Denise and Jeanette. He was living in New York's Westchester County at the time of his death on July 14, 2000, at age 72.

== Exhibitions ==
- 1967, Counterpoints 23, group exhibition, Lever House, New York City, New York; group exhibition included Mahler B. Ryder, Betty Blayton, Alvin C. Hollingsworth, Earl Miller, Faith Ringgold, Jack H. White
- 1968, Fifteen New Voices, group exhibition, American Greeting Card Gallery, New York City, New York; (March 12 – May 3, 1968): group exhibition included Emma Amos, Benny Andrews, Betty Blayton, Emilio Cruz, Avel De Knight, Melvin Edwards, Reginald Gammon, Alvin C. Hollingsworth, Tom Lloyd, William Majors, Earl Miller, Mahler B. Ryder, Raymond Saunders, Jack H. White, Jack Whitten.
- 1969, 30 Contemporary Black Artists, traveling group exhibition at six locations, including the Minneapolis Institute of Art (Mia), Minneapolis, Minnesota; and the San Francisco Museum of Art (now SFMoMA), San Francisco, California; group exhibition included Mahler B. Ryder, Jacob Lawrence, Raymond Saunders, Emma Amos, Benny Andrews, Romare Bearden, Betty Blayton, George Carter, Floyd Coleman, Emilio Cruz, James Denmark, Avel de Knight, Reginald Gammon, Sam Gilliam, Marvin Harden, Felrath Hines, Alvin C. Hollingsworth, Richard Hunt, Cliff Joseph, Norman Lewis, Tom Lloyd, Richard Mayhew, Earl Miller, Robert Reid, Betye Saar, Thomas Sills, Hughie Lee–Smith, Russ Thompson, Lloyd Toone, Ed Wilson, Jack H. White

== Bibliography ==
- Hollingsworth, A. C. I'd Like the Goo-Gen-Heim: writer-illustrator, children's book (1970; reprinted Guggenheim Foundation, 2009)
- Hollingsworth, Alvin C. (illustrator), with Arnold Adoff (compiler), Black Out Loud: an anthology of modern poems by Black Americans (Atheneum, 1970), Atheneum, ISBN 978-0027001006
