= Mahler B. Ryder =

American mixed-media artist, educator (1937–1992)

Mahler Ryder
- Born: Mahler Bessinger Ryder; July 7, 1937; Columbus, Ohio, United States
- Died: February 27, 1992 (aged 54); Providence, Rhode Island, United States
- Education: Columbus College of Art and Design, Ohio State University, Art Students League of New York, School of Visual Arts
- Occupations: Collagist, sculptor, painter, illustrator, educator
- Partner: Susan Bellaire
- Children: 1

Mahler Bessinger Ryder (July 7, 1937 – February 27, 1992) was an American visual artist, illustrator, and educator. He was also a self-taught jazz pianist, and a faculty member at the Rhode Island School of Design for many years. Ryder was a founding member of the Studio Museum in Harlem.

== Biography ==
Mahler Bessinger Ryder was born on July 7, 1937, in Columbus, Ohio. He attended the Columbus College of Art and Design; Ohio State University; the Art Students League of New York; and the School of Visual Arts in New York City.

Ryder was a foundering member of the Studio Museum in Harlem, where he worked as a secretary from 1966 until 1967. He was a faculty member at Rhode Island School of Design from 1969 to 1992. During the civil rights movement, Ryder was as an activist. He was a member of the Black Emergency Cultural Coalition, and participated in their museum protests.

In the 1970s, Ryder created the bronze plaques for Edward Bannister's gravestone. In 2024, these bronze plaques were stolen off the gravestone at Providence's North Burial Ground cemetery. His best known works include The Great American Subway (1969), Homage to the Guitar series and the Jazz Composers series (1980–1989), and The Woman Series (1984). Ryder created a series of mixed media collages that paid tribute to African American jazz and blues figures, such as George Benson, Lead Belly, and B. B. King.

He died of cancer at the age of 54 on February 27, 1992, at Roger Williams Medical Center in Providence. He was survived by his mother, sister, and daughter. Ryder's archive can be found at the Smithsonian American Art and Portrait Gallery Library.

== Exhibitions ==
- 1967, Counterpoints 23, group exhibition, Lever House, New York City, New York; group exhibition included Mahler B. Ryder, Betty Blayton, Alvin C. Hollingsworth, Earl Miller, Faith Ringgold, Jack H. White
- 1968, Fifteen New Voices, group exhibition, American Greeting Card Gallery, New York City, New York; (March 12 – May 3, 1968): group exhibition included Emma Amos, Benny Andrews, Betty Blayton, Emilio Cruz, Avel De Knight, Melvin Edwards, Reginald Gammon, Alvin C. Hollingsworth, Tom Lloyd, William Majors, Earl Miller, Mahler B. Ryder, Raymond Saunders, Jack H. White, Jack Whitten.
- 1969, 30 Contemporary Black Artists, traveling group exhibition at six locations, including the Minneapolis Institute of Art (Mia), Minneapolis, Minnesota; and the San Francisco Museum of Art (now SFMoMA), San Francisco, California; group exhibition included Mahler B. Ryder, Jacob Lawrence, Raymond Saunders, Emma Amos, Benny Andrews, Romare Bearden, Betty Blayton, George Carter, Floyd Coleman, Emilio Cruz, James Denmark, Avel de Knight, Reginald Gammon, Sam Gilliam, Marvin Harden, Felrath Hines, Alvin C. Hollingsworth, Richard Hunt, Cliff Joseph, Norman Lewis, Tom Lloyd, Richard Mayhew, Earl Miller, Robert Reid, Betye Saar, Thomas Sills, Hughie Lee–Smith, Russ Thompson, Lloyd Toone, Ed Wilson, Jack H. White
- 1971, Rebuttal to Whitney Museum, group exhibition, Acts of Art Gallery, New York City, New York
