= Betty Blayton =

American artist, educator and activist

- Born: Betty Jean Blayton; July 10, 1937; Williamsburg, Virginia, United States
- Died: October 2, 2016 (aged 79); Bronx, New York, United States
- Other name: Betty Blayton Taylor
- Education: Syracuse University
- Known for: Painting and art education
- Spouse: Ivanhoe Anthony (Rheet) Taylor (d. 1998)

Betty Blayton (July 10, 1937 – October 2, 2016) was an American activist, advocate, artist, arts administrator and educator, and lecturer. As an artist, Blayton was an illustrator, painter, printmaker, and sculptor. She is best known for her works often described as "spiritual abstractions". Blayton was a founding member of the Studio Museum in Harlem and board secretary, co-founder and executive director of Harlem Children's Art Carnival (CAC), and a co-founder of Harlem Textile Works. She was also an advisor, consultant and board member to a variety of other arts and community-based service organizations and programs. Her abstract methods created a space for the viewer to insert themselves into the piece, allowing for self reflection, a central aspect of Blayton's work.

== Early life and education ==
Betty Jean Blayton was born in Newport News, Virginia in 1937. Her parents were Alleyne Houser Blayton and Dr. James Blaine "Jimmy" Blayton, and she was the second oldest of their four children. Her parents were also active in the African American community. Her father opened the first hospital for black people in his district and her mother constantly fought for education for all. Blayton studied at Bruton Heights until 8th grade and then continued her education at Palmer Memorial Institute in North Carolina until 1955.

Blayton received Bachelor of Fine Arts from Syracuse University and continued her education at the Art Students League and the Brooklyn Museum School. In 1955 when Betty set off for college, Virginia did not allow African Americans to attend any of its segregated all-white universities due to its Jim Crow laws and no public black college in the state offered an accredited degree her chosen major, so Virginia had to pay her full tuition throughout the four years of her college career in order to comply with the federally mandated "separate but equal" requirements for education. This allowed her to attend the school of her choice tuition-free. She graduated in 1959 with a BFA degree in painting and illustration with honors. She then taught at St. Thomas in 1960 for a short period of time before moving to New York.

== Career and contributions ==
Blayton made a major impact on the art museum and foundation world of New York City, working as a museum art educator and co-founding a number of organizations. From 1968 to 1994, she was a consultant to the City of New York Board of Education where she helped develop arts education in public schools and programs. She served as supervisor for the Museum of Modern Art's outreach program to inner city youth. As a co-founder, with Victor D'Amico, and later as executive director, she developed and lead the Children's Art Carnival at the Harlem School of Arts. One of her most successful students was Jean-Michel Basquiat, who is thought to have learned his appreciation of adolescent creativity from Blayton's philosophy that spirit is more important than technique when it comes to your artwork. The program, developed by MoMA in the 1960s for city children, struggled after the loss of government funding in the 1980s, but Blayton worked to find commercial funding to keep it alive. After she moved to New York, she became a part of the Association Community Team of Harlem Youth Opportunities Unlimited where she taught teenagers about art and encouraged them to visit MoMA. When she found her students were denied entry to the museum, she used her contacts there to make sure that did not happen again. This combined with Blayton's idea to create a museum in her student's own community is what led to the creation of the Studio Museum where she served as secretary and executive associate from 1965 to 1977.

She was also a cofounder and board member of Harlem Textile Works. Blayton was a founding member of the Studio Museum in Harlem and served on its board from 1965 to 1977. She also served on the board of the Robert Blackburn Printmaking Workshop.

During the 1970s, she participated in a community art space called Communications Village operated by printmaker Benjamin Leroy Wigfall in Kingston, NY. Andrews made prints with the help of printer assistants who had been taught printmaking by Wigfall, and she exhibited there.

== Exhibitions ==
- "Magnetic Fields" Museum of Fine Art, Saint Petersburg, FL (May 5 – August 5, 2018)
- "Surface Work" Victoria Miro - Mayfair, London (11 April - 16 June 2018)
- "Magnetic Fields" National Museum of Women in the Arts, Washington, DC (October 13, 2017 – January 21, 2018)
- "Magnetic Fields" Kemper Museum of Contemporary Art, Kansas City, MO (June 8 - September 17, 2017)
- "Looking Both Ways" Peninsula Fine Arts Center, NEWPORT NEWS, VA (January 17-March 22, 2015): Curated by Diana Blanchard Gross. Included: Robert Colescott, Betty Blayton, Beverly Buchanan, Faith Ringgold, Clayton Singleton, James Vanderzee, Kara Walker, Carrie Mae Weems, Hank Willis Thomas, Buddy Norris, and others.
- "The Female Aesthetic," Dwyer Cultural Center, NEW YORK NY, (April 19-May 31, 2012): Group exhibition of 11 New York artists. Curated by MLJ Johnson. Included: Beryl Benbow, Betty Blayton, Cecil Chong, Diane Davis, Linda Hiwot, Jamillah Jennings, Charlotte Ka, Dindga McCannon, Gina Sampson, Deborah Singletary, Ava Tomlinson
- Solo Exhibition: "BETTY BLAYTON: Jewels of Thought - Major Work and Concept Studies 1970-2010", Burgess Fine Arts Collection, New York, NY (2010)
- Solo Exhibition: Essie Green Galleries, New York, NY (September 2009)
- Solo exhibition: Strivers Gardens Gallery, New York, NY, (July 2009)
- "Seeing Jazz: A Tribute to the Masters and Pittsburgh Jazz Legends", Manchester Craftsmen's Guild, Pittsburgh PA (January 26-April 3, 2009): Group exhibition. Included: O'Neal Abel, Benny Andrews, Romare Bearden, Sharif Bey, Betty Blayton, Tina Williams Brewer, Fred Brown, Bisa Butler, Lauren Camp, Nora Mae Carmichael, Sadikisha Collier, Robert Daniels, Tafa Fiadzigbe, Frank Frazier, Eric Girault, Verna Hart, Rene Hinds, Jamillah Jennings, MLJ Johnson, Larry Joseph, Charlotte Ka, Eli Kince, Dindga McCannon, Evangeline J. Montgomery, Richard Mayhew, Steve Mayo, Omowale Morgan, Otto Neals, Ademola Olugebefola, Eric Pryor, Faith Ringgold, Senghor Reid, Maurice D. Robertson, Ernani Silva, Danny Simmons, Alexandria Smith, George Smith, Chuck Stewart, Allen Stringfellow, Ann Tanksley, Habib Tiwoni, Osman Tyner, Manny Vega, Richard Waters, Douglas J. Webster, Emmett Wigglesworth, and Shirley Woodson.
- "So It Is With Us: BETTY BLAYTON, 40 Years of Selected Works" - Solo Exhibition at three venues: Canvas Paper and Stone Gallery, Essie Green Galleries, Strivers Gardens Gallery, New York NY (October 2-November 22, 2008)
- Group exhibition: "Betty Blayton and Robin Holder: Daughters of the House of Life" Hammonds House Museum, Atlanta, GA (April 29 - June 21, 2007)
- "BETTY BLAYTON-TAYLOR: Souls/Spirit Journeys" - Solo Exhibition: Smithfield Cultural Arts Center, Smithfield VA (October 2005)
- Group exhibition, National Museum of Ghana, Accra, Ghana - Restoring Our Spiritual Connections: National Conference of Artists International Exhibition (2002)
- Solo Exhibition: Pace College, New York, NY (1994)
- Solo Exhibition: Lubin House Gallery, Syracuse, NY (1993)
- Solo exhibition: Isobel Neal Gallery, Chicago, IL (1990)
- Solo exhibition: Skylight Gallery, Bedford Stuyvesant Restoration Corporation, Brooklyn, NY) (1989)
- "The Wild Art Show", The Museum of Modern Art, New York (January 17 – March 14, 1982)
- Solo exhibition: Caravan House Gallery, New York, NY (April 1975)
- "TWO - Tonnie Jones and Betty Blayton" - The Studio Museum In Harlem. New York City (March 31 May 12, 1974): [Betty Blayton's portion of the exhibit was titled: "BETTY BLAYTON: Prints, Paintings and Sculpture"
- Group Exhibition, Museum of Art, Rhode Island School of Design, Providence, RI "Contemporary Black Artists" (July 1–31, 1969)
- "Counterpoints 23" (March 16–30, 1969)
- "8x8", Riverside Museum, New York City (1968)
- "Six Painters", MARC, New York City (1968)
- Three Women Exhibition, Capricorn Gallery, New York' City (September 10–28, 1968) [Betty Blayton, Freda Mulcahy, Nathalie Van Buren]
- Traveling group exhibition at six locations, "30 Contemporary Black Artists."; Minneapolis Institute of Arts, Minneapolis, Minnesota (October 17-November 24, 1968); San Francisco Museum of Art (now SFMoMA), San Francisco, California (November 26, 1968–); group exhibition included Mahler B. Ryder, Jacob Lawrence, Raymond Saunders, Emma Amos, Benny Andrews, Romare Bearden, Betty Blayton, George Carter, Floyd Coleman, Emilio Cruz, James Denmark, Avel de Knight, Reginald Gammon, Sam Gilliam, Marvin Harden, Felrath Hines, Alvin C. Hollingsworth, Richard Hunt, Cliff Joseph, Norman Lewis, Tom Lloyd, Richard Mayhew, Earl Miller, Robert Reid, Betye Saar, Thomas Sills, Hughie Lee–Smith, Russ Thompson, Lloyd Toone, Ed Wilson, Jack H. White
- "Fifteen New Voices", American Greeting Card Gallery, New York City. (March 12 - May 3, 1968): Group exhibition. Included Emma Amos, Benny Andrews, Betty Blayton, Emilio Cruz, Avel DeKnight, Melvin Edwards, Reginald Gammon, Alvin C. Hollingsworth, Tom Lloyd, William Majors, Earl Miller, Mahler Ryder, Raymond Saunders, Jack H. White, Jack Whitten. [Co-sponsored by Ruder and Finn Fine Arts, Inc. and the Studio Museum in Harlem.]
- Group Exhibition, Lever House, New York City - "Counterpoints 23" (1967) [Included: Betty Blayton, Alvin C. Hollingsworth, Earl Miller, Faith Ringgold, Mahler Ryder, Jack H. White.]
- Group Exhibition, Harlem Cultural Council, New York City - "The Art of the American Negro" (1966) Curated by Romare Bearden. [Included: Charles Alston, Emma Amos, Betty Blayton, Jacob Lawrence, Hughie Lee-Smith, Richard Nugent, Simon B. Outlaw, Faith Ringgold, Vincent D. Smith, Charles White, et al.]
- Solo Exhibition, Capricorn Gallery, New York City (May 4–20, 1966)
- Solo Exhibition, Adair Gallery, Atlanta, Georgia (1963)
- Solo Exhibition, St. Thomas Gallery, Saint Thomas, Virgin Islands (1960)
- Collectors Corner Gallery, Washington, D.C. (1959)
