= Black Emergency Cultural Coalition =

American arts collective

The Black Emergency Cultural Coalition (BECC) was founded by a group of artists as an art strike to protest New York museums for their exclusion of black artists and curators in major art exhibitions. For many years, the BECC and its members directed and sponsored counter-exhibitions, arts education programs, and artists-led demonstrations, including the Harlem on My Mind protest.

== History ==
The Black Emergency Cultural Coalition (BECC) was founded in January 1969 by a group of Black artists-activists to protest questionable practices at The Met and the Whitney Museum.

=== The Met ===
Benny Andrews and others organized the BECC to protest the Metropolitan Museum of Art’s documentary exhibition, “Harlem on My Mind: Cultural Capital of Black America, 1900–68,” that did not include one painting or sculpture by a Harlem-based artist. Romare Bearden, Jacob Lawrence, and Faith Ringgold were all living in Harlem at the time of The Met exhibit, and works by Bearden and Lawrence were already included in The Met's permanent collection.

The BECC argued that by not including the work of a Harlem artist in a show about Harlem, a community with historical significance to Black artists, the Met was passing judgement on the quality and relevance of Black artists.

=== Whitney Museum ===
In addition, the Whitney Museum mounted “The 1930’s: Painting and Sculpture in America” exhibition in 1968, and did not include any black artists in the show.

In response to the Whitney's omission of Black artists, the Studio Museum in Harlem and the BECC presented “Invisible Americans: Black Artists of the ’30s, which included Romare Bearden and Jacob Lawrence who, ironically, were exhibited at the Whitney in the 1930s. The BECC used as their protest slogan the phrase, “Ignored in the ’30s, ignored in the ’60s.”

The BECC protests and demonstrations led to discussions between the Whitney and BECC about future museum shows. The BECC believed that the “Contemporary Black Artists in America” exhibit planned for the Whitney in 1970, would be an opportunity for the Whitney to hire black curators. The Whitney did not agree; Robert “Mac” Doty, a white curator who had organized three previous Whitney shows of black artists, was selected to direct the “Contemporary Black Artists in America” show. To show solidarity with the BECC, 15 Black artists withdrew from the Whitney's “Contemporary Black Artists in America” show.

Two outcomes from the BECC-Whitney protests were: 1. the Whitney purchased additional works by Black artists for its permanent collection; and 2. the Whitney agreed to host “at least five one-man shows for black artists in the small gallery off the Whitney’s lobby.” Between 1969 and 1975, the Whitney hosted one-person shows for Melvin Edwards, Richard Hunt (1969), Alvin Loving (1969), Betye Saar, Alma Thomas (1972), and others in the ground-floor gallery, albeit away from the main gallery spaces on the museum's upper floors.

=== Counter-exhibition ===
As a counter-exhibition, the BECC presented “Rebuttal to the Whitney Museum Exhibition: Black Artists in Rebuttal,” at the black-owned Acts of Art Gallery, located at 15 Charles Street in Greenwich Village. The Acts of Art Gallery was founded by artists Nigel Jackson and Patricia Gray to present the work of Black artists in a neighborhood “outside of the ghetto areas.” "Rebuttal" featured the work of 47 black artists who opposed the “Contemporary Black Artists in America” exhibit.

=== Prison Arts Program ===
In 1971, the BECC created a Prison Arts Program in response to the Attica Prison riot in New York. The following year, the BECC, in collaboration with Artists and Writers Protest Against the War in Vietnam, published the, “Attica Book,” that included black-and-white reproductions of works by forty-eight artists, including Benny Andrews, Faith Ringgold, Irving Petlin, Jacob Lawrence, Jack Sonenberg, Mary Frank, Melvin Edwards, and Vivian Browne. Eventually, the prison arts program would expand to twenty states, and the BECC would sponsor similar programs in juvenile detention centers and mental health facilities throughout the United States.

The BECC sponsored several other arts education programs, including the Artisan Alliance (Green Haven Correctional Facility: Stormville, NY) and Sinbad School of Art (Brooklyn, NY).

=== Non-profit status ===
In 1972, the BECC was incorporated as a non-profit organization. The directors and artists worked on a volunteer basis, and the organization received funding from public and private sources.

The BECC continued to advocate for the inclusion of Black artists and the hiring of Black professionals in curatorial and decision-making roles within New York museums and art galleries into the mid-1970s.

In 1980, the BECC, in partnership with the PPS-Galerie and S. Fischer Verlag, sponsored the 1980 “Xango” exhibit at the Countee Cullen Branch Library in Harlem.

In 1982, the BECC ceased operations.

== Members ==
BECC membership ranged from a dozen of artists to 150 members. The following is a partial membership list.

- Benny Andrews: elected as one of three co-chairs (1969); co-founder; “led protest in front of The Met;” “formed the BECC;” “initial director” of the BECC non-profit
- Romare Bearden: “formed the BECC;” participated in museum protests
- Camille Billops: “initial director” of the BECC non-profit
- Vivian Browne: “initial director” of the BECC non-profit (1972); participated in museum protests
- Francesca Burgess: participated in museum protests
- Zeb Burgess: participated in museum protests
- Barbara Carter: participated in museum protests
- Michael Chisolm: program coordinator for BECC non-profit (1972-)
- Charles Creary: participated in museum protests
- Roy DeCarava: participated in museum protests
- John Dodds: participated in museum protests
- Calvin Douglass (b.1931): participated in museum protests
- Bill Durante: participated in museum protests
- Reginald Gammon: “led protest in front of The Met;” “formed the BECC”; participated in museum protests
- Henri Ghent: elected as one of three co-chairs (1969); “formed the BECC”; participated in museum protests
- Felrath Hines: participated in museum protests
- Clifford Joseph: co-founder; co-chair; “led protest in front of The Met;” “formed the BECC;” “initial director” of the BECC non-profit
- Norman Lewis: “formed the BECC;” participated in museum protests
- Tom Lloyd: participated in museum protests
- Richard Mayhew: participated in museum protests
- Earl Miller (1930–2003): participated in museum protests
- Alice Neel: participated in museum protests
- Mel Ramos: participated in museum protests
- Karen Ryder: participated in museum protests
- Mahler B. Ryder: participated in museum protests
- John Sadler: elected as one of three co-chairs (1969)
- Joan Sandler (b.1934): participated in museum protests
- Raymond Saunders: participated in museum protests
- Tecla Selnick (1909–1983): participated in museum protests
- Frank Sharpe (b.1942): participated in museum protests
- Raphael Sober: participated in museum protests
- Edward Taylor: co-chair; “formed the BECC”
- Russell Thompson: “initial director” of the BECC non-profit (1972); participated in museum protests
