= Vivian E. Browne =

American artist

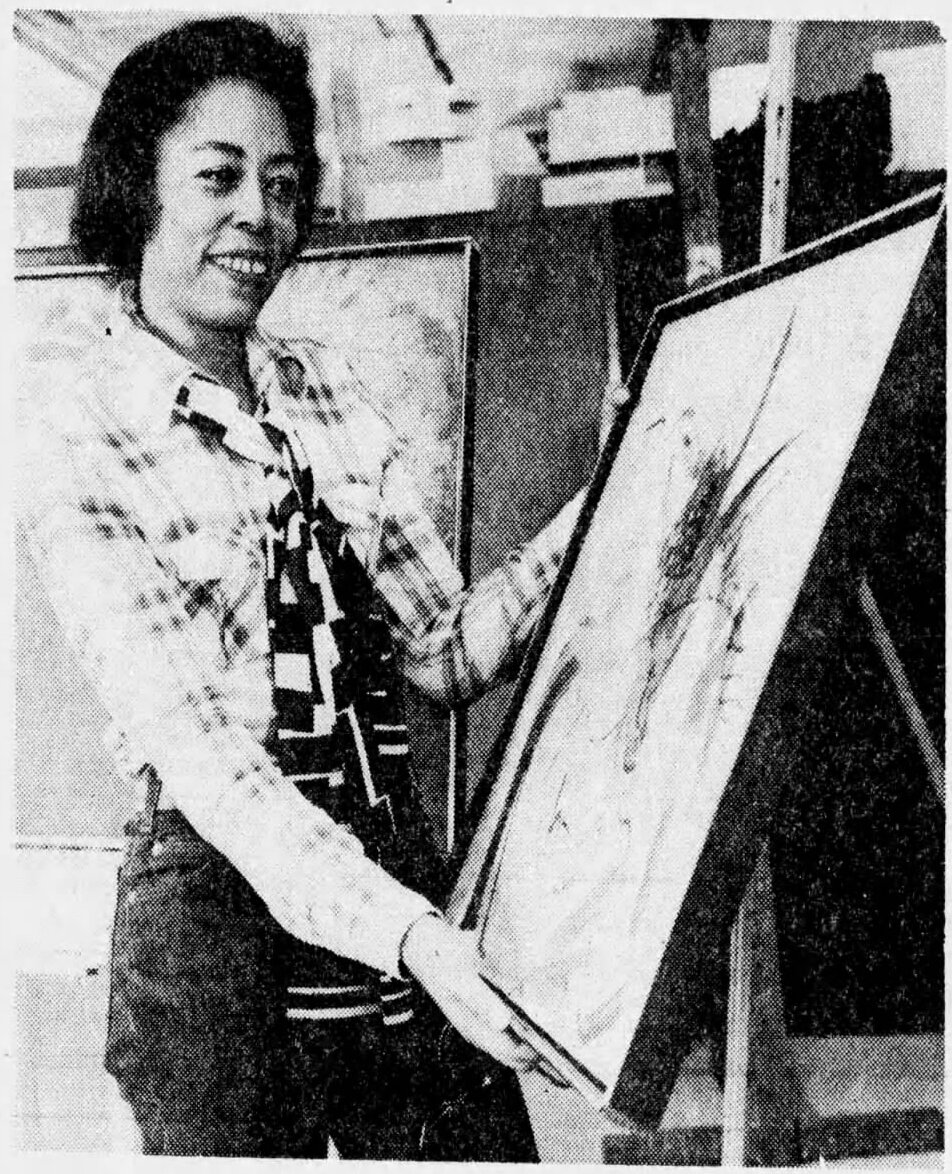
- Browne in 1977
- Born: April 26, 1929; Laurel, Florida, United States
- Died: July 23, 1993 (aged 64); Manhattan, New York, United States
- Education: Hunter College
- Known for: Painting
- Movement: feminist art movement

Vivian E. Browne (April 26, 1929–July 23, 1993) was an American artist. Born in Laurel, Florida, Browne was mostly known for her painting series called Little Men and her Africa series. She is also known for linking abstraction to nature in her tree paintings and in a series of abstract works made with layers of silk that were influenced by her travels to China. She was an activist, professor, and received multiple awards for her work. According to her mother, Browne died at age 64 from bladder cancer.

== Biography ==
Vivian Browne was born in Laurel, Florida, on April 26, 1929. She spent most of her life in South Jamaica, Queens in New York City and Kern County, California. She received her Bachelor of Science in 1950 from Hunter College, New York, NY and a Master of Fine Arts from Hunter College in 1959. Her early painting career was fostered by a scholarship from the New School for Social Research, and a Huntington Hartford Foundation fellowship in 1964 and a fellowship with the MacDowell Colony.

She was invested in her travels across Europe and Africa, also studying at the University of Ibadan in Nigeria in 1972. Browne worked at Rutgers University in Newark from 1971 to 1992 as a faculty member of the Arts and Sciences department while continuing as an artist in her own right with shows across the country.

== Career ==
Browne was a founder of SoHo 20 Gallery, one of the first women's art cooperatives in Manhattan. She had many solo exhibitions there during her lifetime, as well as exhibitions at the Bronx Museum, University of California, Santa Cruz and Western Michigan University. Browne was part of a number of feminist artist organizations including Where We At - Black Women Artists Collective, Inc., the Women's Caucus for Art and Heresies. In 1980 she had an artistic residency at MacDowell. Her work was exhibited at Just Above Midtown gallery (JAM) and in the exhibition Tradition and Conflict: Images of a Turbulent Decade, 1963-1973 at the Studio Museum in Harlem in 1985.

In 2017, Browne was posthumously included in the exhibition We Wanted a Revolution: Black Radical Women, 1965–85, organized by the Brooklyn Museum. In 2018, her work was also shown in Acts of Art and Rebuttal in 1971, an exhibition at Hunter College that revisited the 1971 exhibition Rebuttal to the Whitney Museum Exhibition: Black Artists in Rebuttal organized by members of the Black Emergency Cultural Coalition (BECC) to protest the Whitney Museum's refusal to appoint a Black curator for their survey Contemporary Black Artists in America. Browne had been considered for the Whitney's exhibition but was ultimately not included. She was a founding member of the BECC, with Benny Andrews, Cliff Joseph, Reginald Gammon, among others. She showed at MoMA PS1's space in the Clocktower Gallery in 1986.

In addition to her career as an artist, Browne was a teacher and professor, working in high schools and colleges throughout New York and New Jersey. Browne joined the Rutgers University faculty in 1970, where she taught in the art department from 1975 to 1991. She taught the History of Black Art at Rutgers University, and served as chair of the department from 1975 to 1978. In 1985 she received full professorship at Rutgers, becoming the first African American, and second woman, to do so.

From June 28–September 28, 2025, The Phillips Collection exhibited Vivian Browne: My Kind of Protest exploring Browne's four decade career as a visual artist, activist and teacher, as well as her role as founder of the Black Emergency Cultural Coalition and as a member of SOHO20.

== Collections ==
Browne's work is housed in public and private collections all over the United States, primarily in New York and California. Most notably her work can be found in the collections of the Smithsonian with the Robert Blackburn (artist) printmaking workshop, MOMA, the Schomburg Center NYC, Chase Manhattan Bank the John Cotton Dana Library, the Hatch-Billops Collection, the Wadsworth Atheneum Museum, The New York Public Library and the Harry Belafonte & Rosa Parks private collections. Browne is included in the Center for the Women in the Arts and Humanities virtual exhibit at Rutgers University.

== Activism ==
Browne participated in activist movements in the New York art scene of the 1960s and 1970s, including the Harlem on My Mind protest and BECC protests at the Whitney Museum of American Art. Many of Browne's works, particularly those from the 1960s, showcase her dissatisfaction with the struggles of growing up as a disenfranchised black woman. "Black art is political. If it's not political, it's not black art". While she fought for equality, she was not optimistic about attitudes changing soon, and self categorized her look at art into two categories. "When I am political, I am painting as a black or as a woman or both. Otherwise, I am just a member of the human race."

Browne contributed to, and served as an advisor to, HERESIES: A Feminist Publication on Art and Politics, including serving on the editorial collective for issue #15, Racism is the Issue.

== Achievements ==
In addition to serving as a professor and department chair at Rutgers, Browne was honored most notably for her political works showcasing her life as a black woman. She served as a Fulbright panelist in 1990, and spent much of her time in the 70s and 80s in exhibit curation and symposia. Her many experiences as a panelist include the 1971 NYC's Art Student's League's Symposium on Afro-American Art, the 1973, 1974 and 1976 National Conference of Artists and the NEA amongst others. She was also part of the Soho20 Chelsea, a Broome Street gallery. Additionally, she has been featured in over 80 group and solo exhibitions, including at the Museum of Modern Art (MoMA) and the Orlando Gallery and the Black Art Festival in Atlanta, Georgia.

== Publications ==
- 2022 Vivian Browne - Africa Series, 1971-1974, exhibition catalog published by Ryan Lee Gallery
- 2021 The "Soul of a Nation" Reader: Writings by and about Black American Artists, 1960-1980, published by Gregory R. Miller & Co., pg. 475
- 2019 Vivian Browne - Little Men, exhibition catalog published by Ryan Lee Gallery
- 1999 "Norman Lewis: Interview, August 29, 1974", Artist and Influence: The Journal of Black American Cultural History, no. 18
- 1998 SIGNS, Journal of Women in Culture and Society, Cover Illustration, published by the University of Chicago
- 1998 African American Art, Oxford University Press pg.217
- 1998 Not for Sale: Cat and Art in the USA During the 1970s, a video tape and book by Laura Cottingham, Hawkeye Productions, New York, NY
- 1986 Heresies Magazine, Illustration, 15th Issue
- 1985 Artists and Influences, Hatch-Billops Collection, Inc.
- 1980 Heresies Magazine, Illustration, 9th Issue
- 1979 Heresies Magazine, Photo essay on China, 8th Issue
- 1975 Ararat Magazine,
- 1973 Impressions, Contributor to: 8x10 Art Portfolio (1971–73), published by the Printmaking Workshop, New York, NY,
- 1972 Attica Book
- 1972 "Afro-American Art, Annotated Bibliography", published by the New York City Board of Education
