= Store Front Museum =

Coordinates: 40.700819°N 73.795521°W

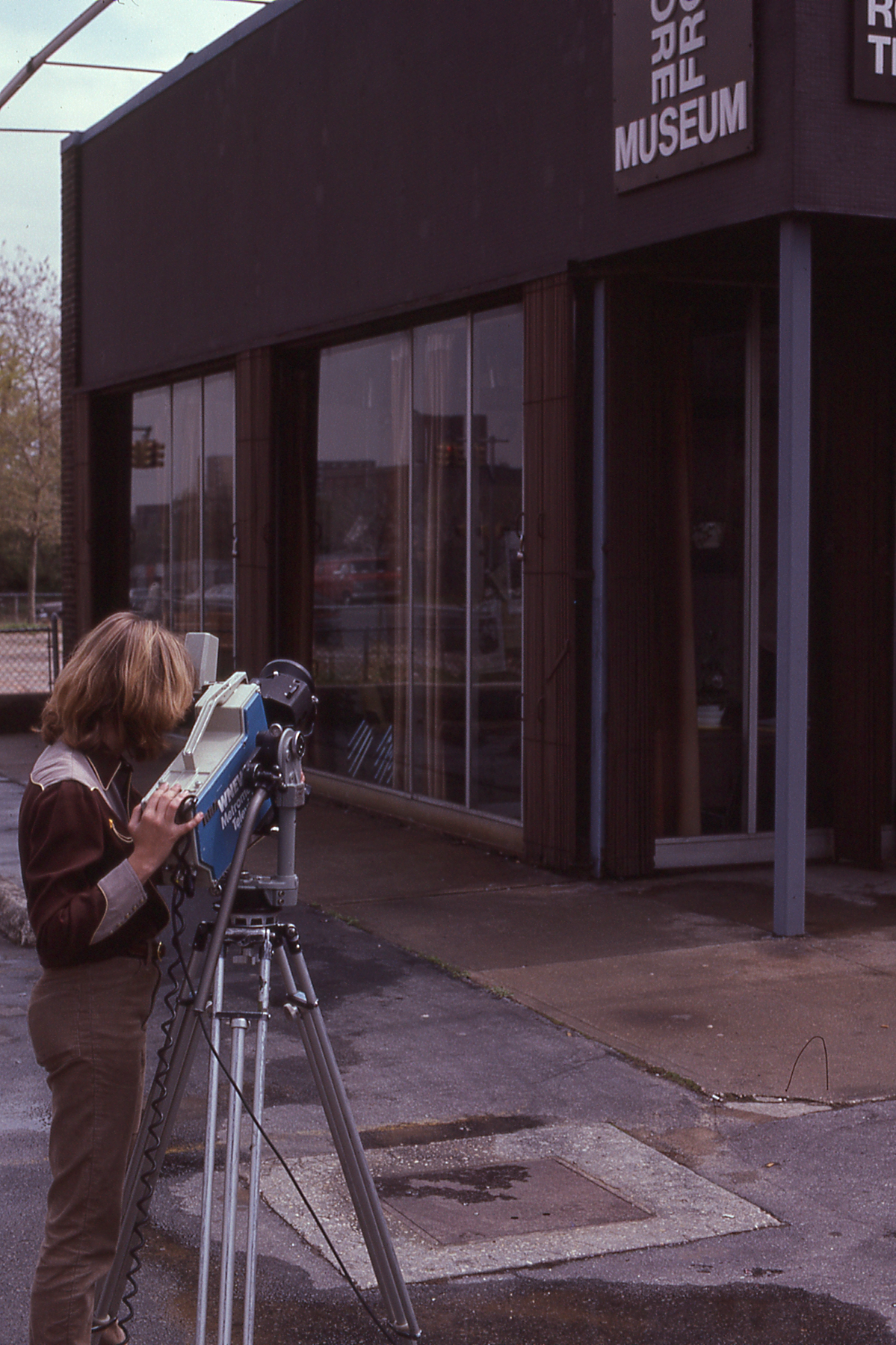

The Store Front Museum was a community museum in Queens, New York that served as a cultural center and exhibition space for the black community of the borough. Established in 1971 by artist Tom Lloyd, it was originally located on Liberty Avenue, in a former retail tire dealer building.

Lloyd was an artist that had made numerous showings around the country before coming to Queens. The museum was established in February 1971 and was devoted to the promotion and dissemination of African-American culture. Lloyd chose the name because "it implies community." The gallery was used for several exhibits, concert plays, karate classes, dance instructions, and festivals over the years. Lloyd acquired many of the museum's materials from donations.

== Events ==
The first prominent exhibition for the museum was Paintings and Drawings by Richard Mayhew in 1972 a collaborative project with The Metropolitan Museum of Art showing a variety of Richard Mayhew's work from a number of New York City galleries. It was the first exhibit to gain large exposure for the museum. The museum also had a permanent collection of materials such as art work, books, photographs, and documents.

The museum continued to have exhibits but the success was not duplicated until the museum's elaborate and acclaimed “Early Photographs and Documents of African-Americans in Queens County, New York,” in 1985.The visual documentary focused on the life styles, deeds, and attitudes of slaves and freedmen from 1683 to 1941 This exhibit stemmed from the major research project and book entitled A Study in Triumph: African-Americans in Queens County, New York 1683-1983 organized by Tom Lloyd and researched and written by Prof. James Rose. The project began in May 1983 with the formation of the Committee for a History of Blacks in Queens. Its role was to hire a researcher, coordinate the research, make recommendations and administer the publication of the book. Mr. Roderick Thurton was hired as the principal researcher and began the research but after a few months was replaced by the Queens College Professor James Rose. Along with an assistant researcher Cynthia Webb and his students, Prof. Rose culled area archives and libraries for information pertaining to African-Americans in Queens. The results of the research were a collection of copied documents (now part of this body of records), the book and the exhibit. There were hopes of publishing a book called African-Americans in Queens County, New York, 1683-1983.

In conjunction with its exhibitions, the museum began to develop a permanent collection containing works of art, books, artifacts, photographs and documents. Included in the permanent collection was the afore mentioned Queens’ African-American material; a Ghanaian fishing canoe given to the museum by the Mystic Seaport Museum who received it from the government of Ghana; art by Romare Bearden; and the Daisy Jones Collection of Black Literature. Of the items from the permanent collection only the Ghanaian fishing canoe's disposition is known. In 1993 the museum gave the canoe to the Smithsonian Institution.

In 1972, the institution opened the Paul Robeson Theatre, a 300-seat theater in which performing arts groups staged major productions. Among those teaching classes and workshops at the museum were playwright Ed Bullins and actor Roscoe Orman, both working at the New Lafayette Theater in Harlem, NY at that time. Drumming classes were taught by the noted pioneering "free" drummer Milford Graves, who lived in the Jamaica, NY community where the museum was located. Another integral program at the institution was the African Festival on the institution's mall space. Began in 1971 the two-day festival included live performances and displays of arts and crafts by New York City organizations to promote the different cultures of Africa. For a number of years the festival was attended by thousands of people.

The institution was also host to a range of special programs and meetings “to accommodate activities that expand community awareness and promote civic betterment.” The programs included "a conference on the Juvenile Justice System;; a workshop on Black Ancestry; a seminar on Housing, Education, Health and Job; A Child Care Symposium; a Sickle Cell Anemia Blood Drive; and meetings of local business groups and professional organizations.” Ironically the institution, with its mission to enlighten and improve the communities of southeastern Queens, became a victim of New York City's efforts to improve these same neighborhoods.

== Closing ==
In January 1985 the institution received an eviction notice for the expansion and renovation of York College. For the next year and a half, Mr. Lloyd administered the institution and attempted to find a viable space. On September 2, 1986, after fifteen years, the institution relocated to a temporary home at 195-45 Jamaica Avenue Hollis, New York. Mr. Lloyd did locate a suitable building at 165-20 Hillside Avenue and was in the midst of securing a long-term lease from the city when in 1988 the Department of General Services, Division of Real Property denied his request and told him the city was going to sell the property.

In 1988, after this long struggle the institution did not get the property and it was permanently closed. However, Mr. Lloyd's activism was undeterred when in the beginning of 1988 he and Rev. Dr. Timothy P. Mitchell of Ebenezer Baptist Church began the effort to save the Lewis Howard Latimer house at 137-53 Holly Avenue Flushing, New York. Mr. Lloyd first heard of the house's eminent destruction from William Asadorian, librarian from the Archives at Queens Borough Public Library. He and Rev. Mitchell with assistance from Queens Historical Society quickly formed The committee to Save Latimer House, with those two as co-chairmen. During the first few months of 1988 the committee began soliciting support garnering a number of prominent advocates including Claire Shulman the Borough President of Queens. They even submitted an application to the Landmarks Preservation Commission to receive landmark status for the house. Spring through Summer 1988 continued their successful campaign with only a minor temporary setback.

On June 30, 1988, the committee and David Bros. Engineering Corp. signed a contract to move the house. But unfortunately in July the Landmarks Preservation Commission denied their request for landmark status. This did not deter the committee or its supporters, because in the next few months the committee received large donations from the General Electric Foundation, the developer who purchased the land and from the city to cover the cost of the move. Also during the summer the committee began a dialogue with Professor James H. Wyche, PhD of Brown University to create the African-American Museum of Science and Technology, eventually this endeavor petered out.

On December 13, 1988, the house was moved from Holly Street to Leavitt's Athletic Field. To solidify the committee articles of incorporation were drawn up to form the Lewis H. Latimer Fund, Inc., in 1989 and on April 21, 1990, they held its first significant event for the house called the “Celebration Luncheon.” However, during 1990 a rift between board members developed and in November Mr. Lloyd and others accused Queens Historical Society members of mishandling funds and solicited the investigative services of the New York State Department of Law's Charities Bureau. No more information is contained in the records or the division's material to document the outcome of these accusations. In 1995, after years of lobbying and to the relief of many the Landmarks Preservation Commission designated the house a New York City Landmark. In that same year Mr. Lloyd donated these papers to Queens Library Archives.
