= Laurel, Florida =

- Census-designated place
- Location in Sarasota County and the state of Florida
- Coordinates: 27°08′08″N 82°27′23″W
- Country: United States
- State: Florida
- County: Sarasota

Area
  - Total: 10.19 sq mi (26.38 km^{2})
  - Land: 9.08 sq mi (23.52 km^{2})
  - Water: 1.10 sq mi (2.86 km^{2})
- Elevation: 13 ft (4.0 m)

Population (2020)
  - Total: 12,186
  - Density: 1,342.0/sq mi (518.13/km^{2})
- Time zone: UTC-5 (Eastern (EST))
  - Summer (DST): UTC-4 (EDT)
- ZIP code: 34272
- Area code: 941
- FIPS code: 12-39600
- GNIS feature ID: 2403223

Laurel is a census-designated place (CDP) in Sarasota County, Florida, United States. The population was 12,186 as of the 2020 census, up from 8,171 at the 2010 census. Laurel is part of the North Port–Bradenton–Sarasota, Florida Metropolitan Statistical Area.

== Geography ==
According to the United States Census Bureau, the CDP has a total area of 6.1 square miles (15.8 km^{2}), of which 5.1 square miles (13.2 km^{2}) is land and 0.97 square miles (2.5 km^{2}), or 16.13%, is water.

== Demographics ==
Historical population
Census	Pop.	Note	%±
1990	8,245		—
2000	8,393		1.8%
2010	8,171		−2.6%
2020	12,186		49.1%
U.S. Decennial Census

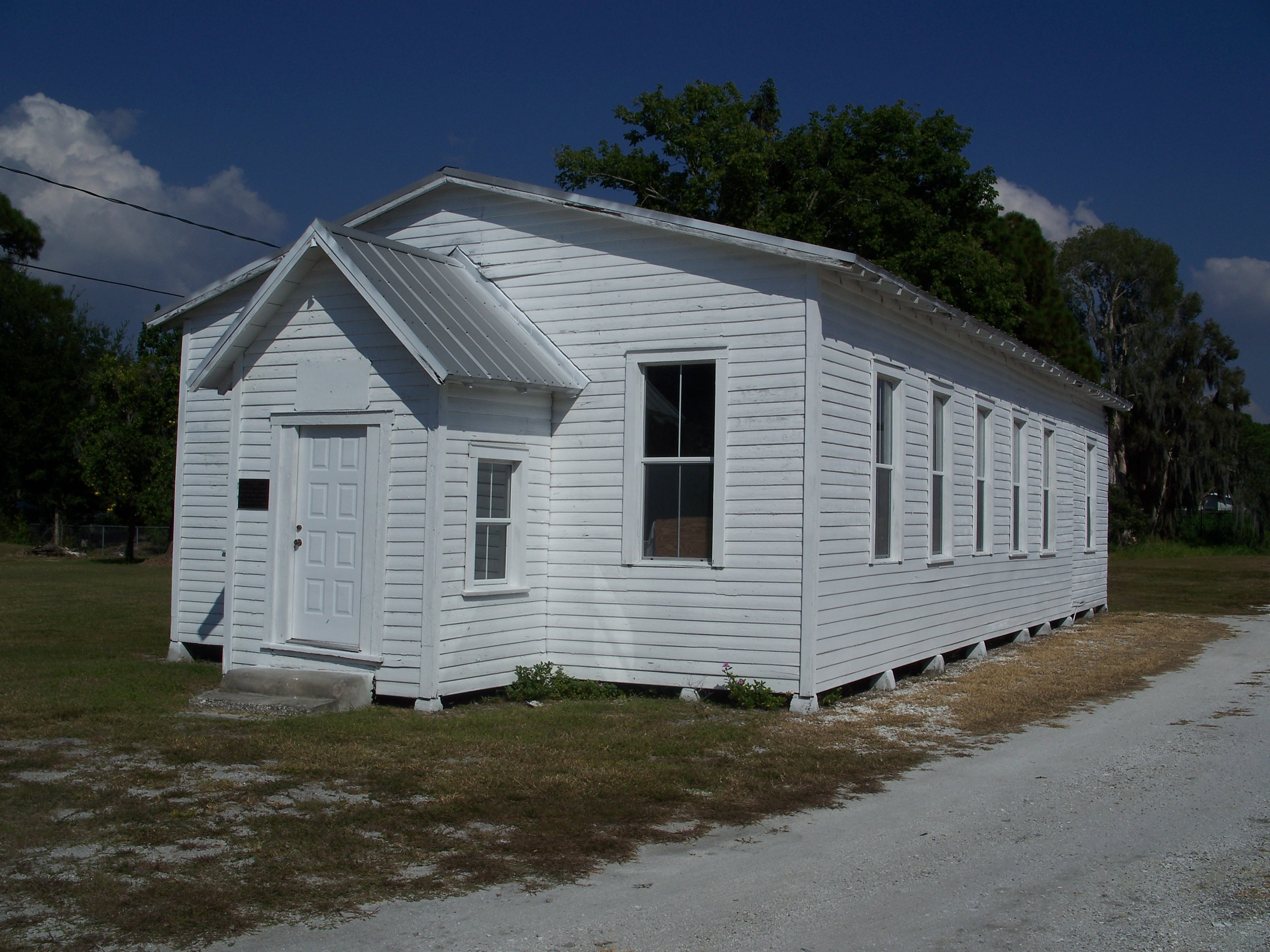
Johnson Chapel Baptist Church, on the National Register of Historic Places

=== 2020 census ===
As of the 2020 census, Laurel had a population of 12,186. The median age was 62.8 years. 10.0% of residents were under the age of 18 and 45.2% of residents were 65 years of age or older. For every 100 females there were 94.4 males, and for every 100 females age 18 and over there were 92.9 males age 18 and over.

100.0% of residents lived in urban areas, while 0.0% lived in rural areas.

There were 6,063 households in Laurel, of which 12.1% had children under the age of 18 living in them. Of all households, 54.1% were married-couple households, 15.5% were households with a male householder and no spouse or partner present, and 24.3% were households with a female householder and no spouse or partner present. About 31.2% of all households were made up of individuals and 20.7% had someone living alone who was 65 years of age or older.

There were 7,494 housing units, of which 19.1% were vacant. The homeowner vacancy rate was 2.7% and the rental vacancy rate was 14.3%.

Racial composition as of the 2020 census
Race	Number	Percent
White	11,022	90.4%
Black or African American	209	1.7%
American Indian and Alaska Native	26	0.2%
Asian	221	1.8%
Native Hawaiian and Other Pacific Islander	11	0.1%
Some other race	124	1.0%
Two or more races	573	4.7%
Hispanic or Latino (of any race)	441	3.6%

=== Demographic estimates ===
According to Census Bureau QuickFacts, 2.8% of the population was under age 5, 50.2% of the population was female, Laurel had 1,193 veterans, 10.6% of residents were foreign-born, and the persons per household value was 2.02.

=== Housing and technology ===
The owner-occupied housing rate was 84.9%. The median value of owner-occupied housing units was $338,200. The median selected monthly owner costs with a mortgage were $2,051, and the median selected monthly owner costs without a mortgage were $590. The median gross rent was $1,569. 94.9% of households had a computer, and 90.0% had a broadband internet subscription.

=== Income and poverty ===
The median household income was $69,850, and the per capita income in the past 12 months was $48,053. 6.3% of the population lived below the poverty threshold.

=== Education ===
96.3% of the population age 25 and older were high school graduates or higher, and 39.2% of that population had a bachelor's degree or higher.

== Notable people ==
- Vivian E. Browne, visual artist
