= Jeanne Reynal =

American artist

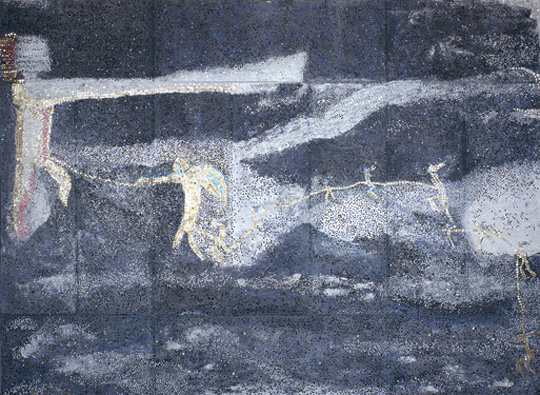
The Blizzard of '88 by Reynal. A Venetian glass mural located in the Nebraska State Capitol.

Jeanne Reynal (1903–1983) was a mosaicist and a significant figure of the New York School group of artists. She showed with Betty Parsons Gallery. Her work is in the collections of Museum of Modern Art, Whitney Museum of American Art, San Francisco Museum of Modern Art, Denver Art Museum, Ford Foundation, New York University, Phillips Academy, and Los Angeles County Museum of Art. Her personal papers from 1942 to 1968 are included in the Archives of American Art.

== Early life ==
Reynal was born in 1903 in White Plains, New York. She was the second of five children. When Reynal was nine years old, her parents separated. She moved to Millbrook, New York with her father where she was taught by a governess. Her other siblings continued to live with her mother.

== Early career ==
At the age of twenty-four, Reynal spent a summer to England, France, and Italy with her siblings and her mother. It was during this trip that Reynal first met the Russian mosaicist Boris Anrep. Two years later, Reynal began an apprenticeship with Anrep in Europe after assisting him with a mosaic he installed in the Bank of England. The two also became romantically involved until Anrep left Reynal for a wealthy Englishwoman.

Reynal left Paris in 1937 and moved to California, where she worked in a potting shed in Marin County. She then moved to the High Sierras, where she built a house and studio.

After living in California for eight years, Reynal returned to her Greenwich Village, New York studio in 1946. At that time, she further developed friendships with artists including Willem and Elaine de Kooning.

She married the painter Thomas Sills in 1955. They traveled together across Russia, Turkey, Greece, and Italy in 1959 to further study the art of mosaic.

== Art and mosaics ==
Reynal was known as a pioneer of mosaics during the New York Abstract Expressionist Movement. Her work prompted a rebirth of ancient mosaic techniques in the modern art world. In addition, Reynal freed the mosaic from the traditional confines of architectural settings. Reynal embraced the layered effect of mosaics, as they could stand alone, be a part of architecture, or engage with nature. One technique Reynal developed to create her murals included mixing own Portland cement. Portland cement is weather tolerant which allows for mosaics to be displayed outdoors for the first time. This medium is only workable for four hours before hardening so Reynal had to be flexible in her designs. The pacing dictated by this medium allowed for some automatic creation. She was inspired by Byzantine mosaics as well as artwork by Mexican, Greek, and American Southwestern artists. Her work discusses mythology through a culturally modern setting. In this way, her mosaic work became accessible to the contemporary art world.
