= Marva Lee Pitchford-Jolly =

American sculptor (1937–2012)

Marva Lee Pitchford-Jolly (1937–2012) was a ceramicist. She is known for her painted, inscribed, clay ‘Story Pots’ which tell of her rural family upbringing in the U.S. state of Mississippi, and other inspirational themes. She is also known for her ‘Friendship Bowls’ as well as for her mud faces in clay sculptural relief. She founded the Mud People’s Black Women’s Resource Sharing Workshop which, in 1987, evolved, with support from Felicia Grant Preston, into the Sapphire and Crystals Collective.

== Early life ==
Pitchford-Jolly was born in Crenshaw, Mississippi, on 11 September 1937, to Mattie Louise Williams, a quilter, and Floyd Pitchford. She was a fraternal twin and one of eight children. Her parents lived on their own farm and as a young child, she started moulding objects out of the clay mud after rain, so starting a life-long skill in handmade clay work. After her mother died in 1948, her father moved north with the children to find work and in 1951 the family went to Chicago, where Pitchford-Jolly lived for the rest of her life.

== Education and career ==
Pitchford-Jolly gained a BA in Urban Studies in 1961 from Roosevelt University. She also gained an M.S. in Ethnic Studies and Political Science in 1974 from Governor's State University. She worked in health planning and social services for some years. She attended her first ceramics class in 1968 at the Hyde Park Neighborhood Club. She was laid off in 1981 after government funding cuts and decided to commit to being an artist. After her first solo show, she was offered and took up a ceramics teaching job at Chicago State University where, because of her technical inexperience, she initially learned along with the students. She later became a tenured Professor of Art there.

In 1986, Pitchford-Jolly was recognised as one of the Top Ten Emerging Black Chicago Artists. She featured in Today's Chicago Woman Magazine. She was artist-in-residence for the Lakeside Group in 1988. Later, her work was highlighted in the 2005 Chicago Woman’s Caucus for Art. In 2008, Pitchford-Jolly's pots were showcased in the 'Kindred Spirits' Exhibit at the Noyes Cultural Arts Center. She did a six-week residency, sponsored by the City of Chicago Artists Abroad program to work with potters in Zambia. She was Artist-in-Residence at New York University.

Her work has been exhibited in museums, universities and galleries, including Philadelphia's Afro-American Historical and Cultural Museum, Georgia State University and Isobel Neal Gallery. It is on permanent display at DuSable Museum of African American History and among the permanent art collection at the Chicago Hilton.

== Ceramics ==
Pitchford-Jolly drew and painted intricate patterns on the surface of her varied clay vessels so making figurative narratives about her family and her experience of growing up Black in Mississippi. Originally in monochrome, her pots were later glazed in vibrant colours. Her Story Pots tended to be spherical and relatively closed, while her Friendship Pots were more shallow and open.

Her pots have been collected and purchased by, for example, Pulitzer Prize-winning novelist Toni Morrison and award-winning author Paule B. Marshall. Her influence has been cited by, for example, Theaster Gates.

== Work in the community ==
As well as teaching and practicing her art, Pitchford-Jolly was also active in her local community in both the local South Side Community Art Center and the Hyde Park Art Center. She opened a studio for art and ceramics, offering her valuable artwork for prices local people could afford. She supported many African American women artists, encouraging them to share ideas, exhibit their work and support each other.

Pitchford-Jolly died on October 21, 2012, at the age of 75.
