= Spiral (arts alliance) =

African-American artist collective

Spiral was a collective of African-American artists initially formed by Romare Bearden, Charles Alston, Norman Lewis, and Hale Woodruff on July 5, 1963. It has since become the name of an exhibition, Spiral: Perspectives on an African-American Art Collective.

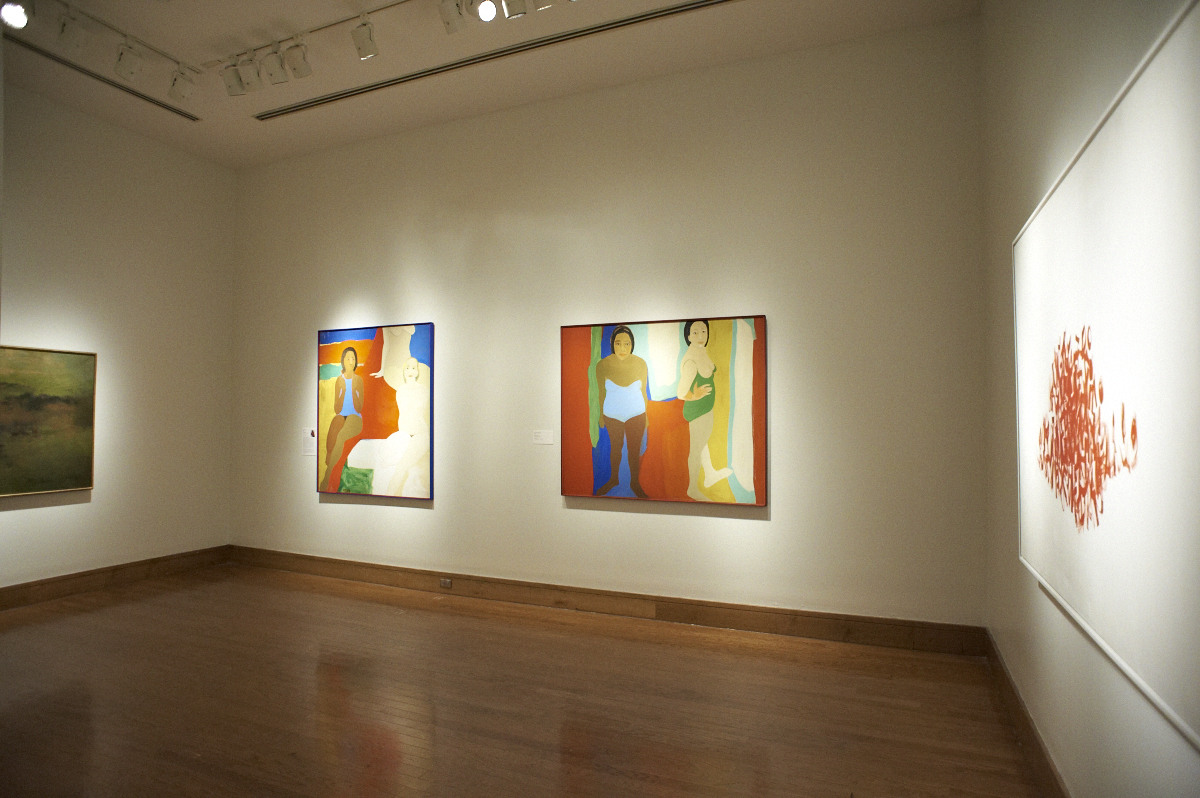
A few of the paintings on display at the Birmingham Museum of Art in Birmingham, Alabama.

== History ==
Active from the summer of 1963 through 1965, the group of artists met weekly to discuss the role of African-American artists in politics and the civil rights movement, as well as in the larger art world, and organized one group exhibition. The group also discussed topics such as the African American experience and the African American image in art.

The group was initiated after artists Romare Bearden and Hale Woodruff invited other artists to discussions in Bearden's loft. Initially the group was concerned with logistical issues, such as obtaining buses to travel to the March on Washington in the summer of 1963. Soon afterward, their efforts turned toward aesthetic concerns, including what author Ralph Ellison called a "new visual order." The members of the group were at varying stages in their careers when they first started meeting. While they did agree that their place, as artists, in the civil rights movement was important, they had differing views on what that place would be. The artists in the group were moved to come together and discuss their own engagement in the struggle for civil rights, even though each found engagement in a different way. The collective allowed for a shared response to the courage that defined the struggle for civil rights.

In the years leading up to the formation of Spiral, most of the artists were doing figurative art work. Several started to experiment with abstraction as they grew as artists and began working more closely together. Bearden expressed the want of collaborating on a collage. But because the group used different techniques and mediums in their works, they decided that there would be other ways to impact the movement. Although the group was active for only a short time, Spiral proved to be important as an historical initiative, and was one of the first artist groups to call for the cultural community's involvement in social change.

The group's only exhibition was May 14 through June 4, 1965, titled First Group Showing: Works in Black and White. The exhibition at their Christopher Street space was in part a response to the trend of major art institutions to overlook the work of African-American artists. Bearden had suggested the exhibition's black-and-white theme because it comprised both socio-political and formal concerns.

The Spiral group was relatively ignored in much traditional art history since its demise. But interest in the group was rekindled by a group exhibition of the collective in Birmingham and New York in 2010-2011, and the associated catalogs. The exhibition looks at the way the Spiral collective came into its own during a period of American history full of unrest, and the varied visual responses of African-American artists.

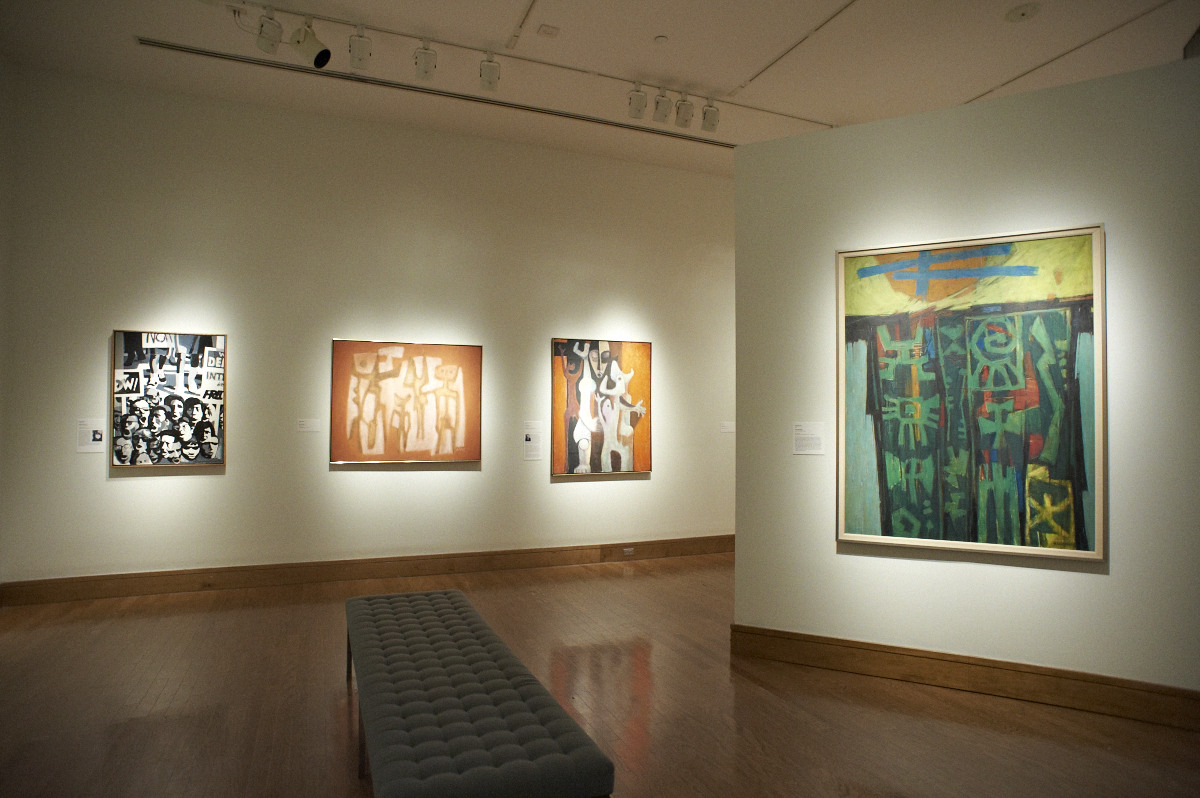
A few more of the works on display at the Birmingham Museum of Art.

== Artists ==
- Charles Alston - painter, sculptor, illustrator, and teacher
- Emma Amos - painter, mixed media
- Romare Bearden - collages, watercolors, oils, and prints
- Ernest Crichlow - painter, illustrator
- Calvin Douglass - painter
- Perry Ferguson - painter
- Reginald Gammon - oil paints, watercolors, drawings, and prints
- Felrath Hines - abstract expressionism
- Alvin Hollingsworth - comics, paints
- Norman Lewis - painter
- William Majors - drawing, painting, paper collages, 3D canvases
- Richard Mayhew - painter
- Earl Miller - painting, pencil drawings
- Merton Simpson-abstract paintings
- Hale Woodruff - murals, paintings, prints
- James Yeargans - painter

== Name ==
Woodruff suggested the name "spiral" in reference to the Archimedean spiral that "moves outward embracing all directions, yet continually upward". The name also represented the diversity of styles and interests represented by the work of the members as they "sought to move toward common goals as individual artists and as African-American people".

== Exhibitions ==
Spiral: Perspectives on an African-American Art Collective was on view at the Birmingham Museum of Art from December 5, 2010 through April 17, 2011. It was organized by Emily G. Hanna and Amalia Amaki. The exhibition was on view at the Studio Museum in Harlem, July 14 through October 23, 2011. Spiral: American Masters was on view at Evolve the Gallery (accompanied by a full catalog) from April 12 through May 24, 2014.

== See also ==
- Sapphire and Crystals, American women's artists collective in Chicago
