= Sapphire and Crystals =

American artists collective in Chicago

Sapphire and Crystals is an artist collective of women of African descent, based in Chicago, Illinois. It was founded in 1987 by ceramicist and teacher Marva Lee Pitchford-Jolly and visual artist Felicia Grant Preston. The still active collective has held group exhibitions in several galleries and community spaces across Chicago with a changing line-up of members throughout their over-30-year history. The mission of the group was to create a network of support for black women artists and provide opportunities for them to exhibit their work. Outside of the collective, each member of Sapphire and Crystals holds an independent practice in a wide array of mediums.

== History ==
Sapphire and Crystals emerged during a period of many other feminist groups and artist collectives in Chicago during the 1970s and 1980s. The early planning for Sapphire and Crystals began with conversations between Marva Lee Pitchford-Jolly and Felicia Grant Preston in 1986 as response to the dissolution of the artists' former collective, Mud People's Black Women's Resource Sharing Workshop. The group encourages mentoring, and exposure for early career artists through exhibitions. The name of the collective was inspired by the strength and beauty of the sapphire gemstone, as well as the negative "Sapphire" stereotype used against strong-willed black women, and the spiritual and healing properties crystals.

== List of members ==
There have been over 40 members throughout Sapphire and Crystal's history, with some participating continually since the beginning and others only showing with the collective for one exhibition.

These members include:

- Joyce Owens Anderson
- Mary Ann Abella
- Leticia Appleberry
- Stephanie Bird
- Rose Blouin
- Venus Blue
- Cheryl Boone
- Simone Bouyer
- Patricia Bohannon
- Rhonda Bristol
- L'Tanya Cason (aka. Akosua Bandele)
- Dorothy Carter
- Glendia Cooper
- Faith Davis
- Evelyn Davis Frazier
- Kay Dawson
- Debra Dillworth
- Jackie Duncan
- Jan Spivey Gilcrhrist
- Felicia Grant Preston
- Juarez Hawkins
- Carol James
- Linda James
- Sheryl Jones
- Makeba Kedem-DuBose
- Annie Lee
- Lillian Morgan-Lewis
- Kathy O'Kelley
- Marva Lee Pitchford-Jolly
- Monica Plott Ratcliff
- JoAnne Scott
- Patricia J. Stewart
- Shirley Sullivan
- Dorian Sylvain
- Pearlie Taylor
- Renee Townsend
- Arlene Turner-Crawford
- Anna McCullough Tyler
- Beverly Warner
- Shahar Caren Weaver
- Rhonda Wheatley
- Shyvette Williams
- Renee Williams Jefferson

== Exhibitions ==
The collective had its first exhibition, An Exhibition of Black Female Artists Working in the Chicago Area, at the South Side Community Art Center from June 28 to July 19, 1987. Their second exhibition, Sapphire and Crystals Too, was hosted at Nicole Gallery at 230 W Huron St., Chicago, IL from February 2–29, 1988.

- Sapphire and Crystals: Images, Wood Street Gallery, Chicago, Illinois 1993
- Wish You Were Here: Postcard Show at Wood Street Gallery, Chicago, Illinois
- Sapphire and Crystals, Satori Fine Art Gallery, Chicago, Illinois, 1995
- The Way My Mama Did, BAGIT Gallery, Chicago, Illinois, 1996
- Diaspora Ashe, Vergie Buxton Gallery, Chicago, Illinois
- Sapphire and Crystals Invitational at Chicago State University President's Gallery, Chicago, Illinois
- Mentors, Goddesses, and Other Heroes, Chicago, Illinois, 2001
- Sapphire and Crystals in Black and White (a tribute to Spiral) at Concordia University, River Forest, Illinois, February 2004
- Sapphire and Crystals Rites of Spring at Fourth Presbyterian Church, Chicago, Illinois, March 2005
- Sapphire and Crystals: Black White and Blues, Woman Made Gallery, Chicago, Illinois, October 7 - November 10, 2005
- Routes to Roots, Nicole Gallery - 2009
- BEyONd Race and Gender at Noyes Cultural Arts Center, Evanston, Illinois, January 23 - March 12, 2009
- Sapphire and Crystals, Friendship Show, South Side Community Art Center, Chicago, Illinois, 2010
- Sapphire and Crystals, Postcard Show, South Side Community Art Center, Chicago, Illinois, 2010
- Sapphire and Crystals: Visions at Elmhurst College's Frick Center - 2010
- State of G/Race: Sapphire and Crystals Celebrate 25 Years at Woman Made Gallery, Chicago, Illinois, 2012
- The Divine Marva Pitchford-Jolly: Sapphire and Crystals Remember, South Side Community Art Center, Chicago, Illinois, 2013
- Sapphire and Crystals at Prairie State College, Chicago Heights, Illinois, 2013
- Sapphire and Crystals, Forward, Bridgeport Art Center, 2022
- Sapphire and Crystals, Freedom's Muse, Logan Center for the Arts, Chicago, Illinois, 2023
