= Richard Mayhew =

American painter (1924–2024)

- Born: April 3, 1924; Amityville, New York, U.S.
- Died: September 26, 2024 (aged 100); Soquel, California, U.S.
- Education: Art Students League of New York, Columbia University
- Alma mater: Brooklyn Museum Art School
- Known for: Landscape painting
- Movement: Spiral (arts alliance)
- Spouses: Dorothy Zuccarini, Rosemary Gibbons
- Children: Ina Mayhew and Scott Mayhew

Richard Mayhew (April 3, 1924 – September 26, 2024) was an American landscape painter, illustrator, and arts educator, of Native and African American descent. His abstract, brightly colored landscapes are informed by his experiences as an African American/Native American and his interest in Jazz and the performing arts. He lived and worked in Soquel and Santa Cruz, California.

== Early life and career ==
Richard Mayhew was born on April 3, 1924, in Amityville, New York, to Native American and African American parents. His father Alvin Mayhew, was of Montaukett/Shinnecock descent and his mother, Lillian Goldman Mayhew was of African American and Cherokee-Lumbee descent. He was an enrolled-citizen of the Montaukett Indian Nation. His mother would take him to New York City to see paintings, and he was inspired at a young age by George Inness paintings. As a teenager he studied with medical illustrator James Willson.

Mayhew was in the United States Marines with the Montford Point Marines, rising to the rank of first sergeant during World War II. However, in a 2019 interview, Mayhew stated he did not identify with his time in military service, and it inspired his interest in interdisciplinary studies.

Mayhew studied at the Art Students League of New York and with artist Edwin Dickinson. Later attending Brooklyn Museum Art School in 1948 to 1959, and studying with Reuben Tam. He also took some courses at Columbia University. He worked as a china decorator in the late 1940s in New York, where he met his first wife Dorothy Zuccarini.

Mayhew was a Jazz singer in the 1950s, performing in small clubs in New York City and in the Borscht Belt of the Catskill Mountains. In 1955 he had his first solo exhibition at the Brooklyn Museum, and he ended his singing career. In 1957 he had his first solo gallery show at Morris Gallery.

In 1958, Mayhew won the John Hay Whitney Fellowship and took his family with him to Europe. In the 1960s, he illustrated children's books.

Mayhew was a founding member of Spiral, a black painters' group in the 1960s New York, which included Romare Bearden, Charles Alston, Charles White, Felrath Hines, Norman Lewis, Emma Amos, Reginald Gammon, and Hale Woodruff as members. The Spiral collective formed in 1963, after the March on Washington for Jobs and Freedom, as a way for artists to discuss their experiences in the Civil Rights movement. He was also a member of the Black Emergency Cultural Coalition.

For 14 years he taught at Pennsylvania State University, starting in 1977 and retiring in 1991. He taught art and/or interdisciplinary thinking at other schools around the United States, including Brooklyn Museum Art School (1963), Pratt Institute (1963), Art Students League of New York (1965), Smith College (1969), Hunter College (1971), California State University, East Bay (1974), San Jose State University (1975), Sonoma State University (1976), University of California, Santa Cruz (1992), and others. He was introduced to interdisciplinary learning during his time teaching at Pratt which at the time offered different disciplines alongside art studio, and he was working alongside other instructors such as Eleanor Holmes Norton (teaching sociology), Jacob Lawrence, and William A.J. Payne (teaching anthropology). Students of Mayhew include Beverly McIver, Rodney Allen Trice, among others.

In 1991, Mayhew moved to Soquel in Santa Cruz County, California.

ACA Galleries represented Richard Mayhew for over thirty years beginning in 1996. Over this time, the gallery organized solo exhibitions at ACA in 1998, 2002, 2005, 2020 and 2025 as well as numerous solo museum exhibitions for the artist and continues to do so today.

A selection of solo museum exhibitions include: The Telfair Museum of Art, Savannah, GA (2008); Avram Gallery at Stony Brook, Southampton, NY (2009); The Museum of the African Diaspora, San Francisco, CA; The Museum of Art and History at the McPherson Center, Santa Cruz, CA (2009); De Saisset Museum, Santa Clara University, CA (2009); and Ringling College of Art and Design, Sarasota, FL (2021).

A solo retrospective exhibition of Mayhew's work took place in 2009 in New York City at ZONE: Contemporary Art at 41 West 57th Street

In 2020, ACA Galleries organized a major exhibition of Mayhew’s paintings and watercolors which was accompanied by the first and only comprehensive monograph of the artist’s work, Transcendence (2020, Chronicle Books, San Francisco) with an introduction by ACA Galleries Curator and Director, Mikaela Sardo Lamarche and an essay by Andrew Walker, the former Director of the Amon Carter Museum of American Art.

In 2022, the Heckscher Museum of Art exhibited Richard Mayhew: Reinventing Landscape, an exhibition of paintings created throughout his career.

In 2023, Venus Over Manhattan opened its new gallery at 39 Great Jones Street with "Richard Mayhew: Natural Order," displaying about twenty of his paintings and works on paper. The exhibition featured significant contributions from backers of Mayhew's art and was complemented by a catalog. Later that year, the Sonoma Valley Museum of Art launched a comprehensive retrospective titled "Richard Mayhew: Inner Terrain," which highlighted his evolution as an artist.

In 2025 ACA Galleries organized the retrospective exhibition Richard Mayhew: A Life in Art.

Mayhew's work is featured in various permanent collections including: San Francisco Museum of Modern Art (SFMoMA), De Young (museum), Metropolitan Museum of Art, Whitney Museum of American Art, Heckscher Museum of Art, and the Smithsonian American Art Museum, among others.

== Personal life and death ==
Mayhew was married to artist Dorothy Zuccarini and together they had two children, Ina Mayhew and Scott Mayhew. His second marriage was to Rosemary Gibbons.

Mayhew died on September 26, 2024, at the age of 100 at his home in Soquel, California.

== Filmography ==
Years	Title	Type	Notes
2000	Richard Mayhew: Spiritual Landscapes	Film documentary	
2009	Richard Mayhew, on Spark for This Week in Northern California, KQED	Television series	

== See also ==
- List of African-American visual artists
