= Harlem on My Mind protest =

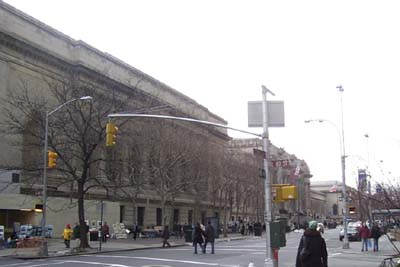
The Metropolitan Museum of Art

The Harlem on My Mind protests were a series of protest actions in New York, organized by the Black Emergency Cultural Coalition (BECC) in early 1969 in response to the Metropolitan Museum of Art's exhibition Harlem on My Mind: Cultural Capital of Black America. The exhibition, focused on the Harlem Renaissance and intended as the museum's first show exploring the cultural achievements and contributions of African Americans, was heavily criticized by black audiences for not actually including any art by black artists, instead presenting documentary photographs and murals of the Harlem neighborhood, and for the exhibition's inclusion of several racist and antisemitic statements. The BECC—a group of African-American contemporary artists and activists that formed in response to the exhibition—organized a series of boycotts and protests outside and inside the museum before and after the show opened, leading to national news coverage and a series of institutional responses from the museum.

The protests were followed by a heightened period of black activism within the art world, including several protests and boycotts at other New York museums in the following years. The events have also been cited by art historians as a key moment in the history of American art for the long-term impacts they had on museums' approaches to supporting and exhibiting art by African Americans.

== Background ==
=== Harlem on My Mind ===
When The Met mounted its special exhibition "Harlem on My Mind": The Cultural Capital of Black America, 1900–1968, in 1969, the Museum was preparing for its one hundredth anniversary. It was part of a suite of programming that Director Thomas Hoving had launched to celebrate the landmark year. A press release in 1967 announced the ambition to present Harlem's "achievements and contribution into American life and to the City." Thomas Hoving had planned a three-month long multimedia exhibition called Harlem on My Mind intended to highlight the history of Harlem since 1900. The exhibition consisted of floor-to-ceiling introductory photomurals, and then photographs of various sizes depicting life in Harlem, but no artwork by Black artists. The accompanying catalog included a term paper written by Harlem resident and recent graduate of Theodore Roosevelt High School (New York City) Candice Van Ellison containing copious antisemitic and anti-Irish slurs, and was subsequently pulled from publication by Hoving. Portions of the essay can be found quoted within Bridget R. Cooks' 2011 work Exhibiting Blackness: African Americans and the American Art Museum (University of Massachusetts Press). The exhibition was also an attempt to respond to the Civil Rights movement, which had reached a fever pitch with the assassination of Martin Luther King, Jr. and the Civil Rights Act of 1968. It was a contentious moment, and there were signs of controversy long before the show opened to the public. As early as a year in advance of the opening, various committee members and prominent Black artists withdrew their support for the exhibition. One of the central complaints was the exclusion of work by Black artists, such as Romare Bearden, Faith Ringgold, and Jacob Lawrence—all of whom were living in Harlem at the time.

== Black Emergency Cultural Coalition (BECC) ==
The BECC was organized in January 1969 by a group of 75 African American artists in direct response to the Metropolitan Museum of Art's "Harlem on My Mind" exhibit. The co-chairmen at the time of creation were Benny Andrews, Henri Ghent, and Edward Taylor.

== Defacement ==
On January 16, 1969, ten paintings in the museum were defaced, possibly in response to the exhibition. Small "H's" were scratched mostly into varnish covering the paintings; each of the paintings was successfully repaired. The BECC denounced the vandalism, and the case was never solved.

== Responses ==
=== Official responses ===
Released on January 21, 1969 Thomas Hoving's press release, in which he responds to "all persons who have been offended", responds to the Harlem on My Mind controversy that can be read in full via the Thomas J. Watson Library's Digital Archives. The purpose of the article from Hoving was an apology towards "the deeply disturbed groups of persons in this city" The Mayor Lindsay, despite being a friend of Hoving's, criticized the Museum for its choices as racist, antisemitic, anti-Irish, and anti-Puerto Rican, later threatening to withhold financial support from the Museum if the catalogue were not removed. Hoving included two disclaimers in the catalogue warning of the racism and antisemitism within, and Random House (the publisher) included these in bookstore copies, as well as issuing their own apology. State Commissioner of Human Rights Robert Magnum asked that the show be closed "until it reflects a more accurate record of the aspirations, achievements and goals of the black people of New York."

=== Art criticism ===
Art critics were divided in their responses. Many argued whether the Museum should even include exhibits of "sociological documentation", and if that should be considered art or not, or where such an exhibit should be included. Then The New York Times art critic John Canaday admitted he knew little of Harlem culture, and what he did know had been influenced by common perception of Black culture as being a modernization and extension of "plantation" culture, concluding that he was not qualified to judge a show like "Harlem on My Mind". By March 1969, the exhibit was reported to still be drawing large crowds. Almost 75,000 people visited the show during its opening week, and hundreds of thousands more before it closed later in March. Throughout, picketing continued.

=== Artists and activists ===
Artist, writer, and activist Sabra Moore was one of the many artists and activists to join demonstrations against the exhibit. Moore wrote a detailed description of one of the demonstrations in front of the Museum during that time.
