= Cliff Joseph =

Panama-born American artist, art therapist, and activist (1922–2020)

- Born: Clifford Ricardo Joseph; June 23, 1922; Panama City
- Died: November 8, 2020 (98); Chicago
- Education: Pratt Institute
- Known for: painting, art therapy, activism

Clifford Ricardo Joseph (June 23, 1922 – November 8, 2020) was a Panama-born American artist, art therapist and activist.

== Early life ==
Cliff Joseph was born in 1922 in Panama City. (Note: Joseph's birth year is occasionally cited as 1927.) At the time, his father was employed in the construction of the Panama Canal. His parents emigrated to the United States the following year, settling in Harlem, New York. Joseph enrolled in the army, and served overseas in a field artillery unit. Following WWII, he studied at the Pratt Institute in New York, receiving a degree in illustration in 1952; he later taught art therapy at Pratt. He also attended the Turtle Bay School of Therapy.

== Art and activism ==
In 1968, he co-founded the Black Emergency Cultural Coalition (BECC) with Benny Andrews, Henri Ghent, Reggie Gammon, Mahler Ryde and Edward Taylor. Faith Ringgold was also a member of BECC. Its goal was to bring attention to the lack of representation of Black artists in New York City galleries and museums. The founding and mission of the group came in response to the Metropolitan Museum of Art's presentation of the exhibition Harlem on My Mind, which included no Black artists. BECC protested the show, leading to a rebuke of the museum from the mayor of New York City, as well as a public apology from the Metropolitan Museum itself.

Joseph and BECC went on to protest at the Whitney Museum of American Art exhibition Contemporary Black Artists in America, for which the Whitney had hired a White curator. 15 Black artists pulled out of the exhibition the day it was to open. In response to the Whitney exhibition, Joseph remarked that it was essential for Black art to be curated by someone "whose wisdom, strength and depth of sensitivity regarding black art is drawn from the well of his [sic] own black experience". As co-chair of the BECC with Benny Andrews, Joseph went on to organize a rebuttal exhibition, titled Rebuttal to Whitney Museum Exhibition, held at the Acts of Art Gallery in Manhattan. Joseph and Andrews also requested that the Whitney postpone its exhibition in order for consultation with BECC and "other community representatives" to take place. The Whitney rejected their offer.

According to a 1978 profile, Joseph's art practice "ma[de] racism, war, and sexism his principal pictorial concerns". One study links him to the Black Arts Movement. Joseph strongly opposed the Vietnam War. Paintings including Isaiah II:4 (1964) and The Playpen (1967) reject both the war in Vietnam and war in general.

During the 1971 Attica Prison uprising, Joseph and Andrews presented a letter to Governor Nelson Rockefeller suggesting a variety of cultural activities and art-based therapies for prisoners.

== Art therapy ==
Joseph was among the first African Americans to join the professional practice of art therapy, and is considered to have made a significant contribution to the practice. Joseph was the first African American to join the American Art Therapy Association. As of 1982, he practiced art therapy at Lincoln Hospital and was on staff at the Albert Einstein College of Medicine.

== Publications ==
- Harris, Jay; Joseph, Cliff (1973). Murals of the Mind: Image of a Psychiatric Community. New York: International Universities Press. ISBN 0-8236-3490-6. OCLC 623262.
- Joseph, Cliff (1997). "Reflections on the Inescapable Political Dimensions of Art and Life". In Farris-Dufrene, Phoebe M. (ed.). Voices of Color: Art and Society in the Americas. Atlantic Highlands, New Jersey: Humanities Press. pp. 46–54. ISBN 9780391039919. OCLC 1036917184.

== Sources ==
- Fine, Elsa Honig (1982). The Afro-American Artist: A Search for Identity. New York: Hacker Art Books. ISBN 9780878172870. OCLC 1145793678.
- Wallace, Caroline V. (2015). "Exhibiting Authenticity: The Black Emergency Cultural Coalition's Protests of the Whitney Museum of American Art, 1968–71". Art Journal. 74 (2): 5–23. doi:10.1080/00043249.2015.1095535. ISSN 0004-3249. JSTOR 43967616. S2CID 191163065.
