= Tom Lloyd (artist) =

American sculptor (1929–1996)

- Born: 1929; Detroit, Michigan, United States
- Died: 1996 (aged 66–67)
- Education: Pratt Institute
- Occupations: Sculptor, activist and community organizer
- Known for: Sculpture

Tom Lloyd (1929–1996) was an American sculptor, activist and community organizer.

== Early life and education ==
Tom Lloyd was born in 1929 in Detroit, Michigan, United States. During his infancy his family moved to Brooklyn, New York, and later to Jamaica, Queens, New York, where he spent the majority of his childhood and gained his love for art. He studied art at the Pratt Institute in Brooklyn and the Brooklyn Museum.

== Artistic career ==
In 1968, Lloyd's work was chosen as the subject for the inaugural exhibition of the Studio Museum in Harlem, Electronic Refractions II, which opened on September 24, 1968, featuring his electronically programmed light sculptures. (That exhibition would subsequently inspire the title of the 2020 traveling exhibition Black Refractions: Highlights from The Studio Museum in Harlem.) Lloyd's work in the exhibition proved controversial, departing as it did from a figurative aesthetic prevalent in African-American art at the time. He usually used art methods that included murals such as designs, painting, fresco and glass. Lloyd talks about his work and the mission of the museum to create opportunities for black artists who serve as mentors to young artists in the Harlem community. He implores black artists to be more involved with politics.

A few months before the opening, Lloyd participated in a 1968 roundtable, The Black Artist in America: A Symposium at The Met. The discussion was moderated by Romare Bearden and included artists Sam Gilliam Jr., Richard Hunt, Jacob Lawrence, William T. Williams, and Hale Woodruff.

In 1971, Lloyd edited a volume of commissioned essays written by African American cultural producers called Black Art Notes, to which he also contributed. In his essay he addressed the need for a relationship between art and social and political action. The publication as a whole was intended as a "counter-statement" to Robert Doty's catalog introduction of the Contemporary Black Artists in America exhibition held at the Whitney Museum in 1971.

Also in 1971, Lloyd founded the Store Front Museum in Queens, NY. Located in the predominantly Black neighborhood of Jamaica, the space served as a vital cultural hub hosting exhibitions, concerts, lectures, and festivals as well as other community enrichment activities like dance and karate lessons. The Store Front Museum in New York, a cultural center that hosted exhibitions, concerts, classes, and lectures for the predominantly Black community of Jamaica, Queens, for more than a decade. The center acted in tandem with his call for the marriage of social action and aesthetics in Black Art Notes, published the same year.

When the Studio Museum in Harlem opened its new space at 144 West 125th Street on November 15, 2025, one of the inaugural exhibits was Tom Lloyd, a retrospective of Lloyd's career; the show was accompanied by an exhibition catalog and a retrospective monograph, the first of Lloyd's career.

== Political activism ==
Lloyd was a founding member of the Art Workers Coalition (AWC) and, initially, the only black artist. He was instrumental in recruiting Faith Ringgold into the group and together with John Hendricks and others, used the group as a platform to advocate for integrating museums through the creation of Black and Puerto Rican advisory boards and through acquiring and holding more exhibitions of Black and Puerto Rican artists' work. Before joining the AWC, Lloyd briefly joined the Black Emergency Cultural Coalition (BECC), but found their approach to social change too meek.

== Selected exhibitions ==
- 1965, Amel Gallery
- 1965, Art Turned On, Institute of Contemporary Art, Boston
- 1965, Light as a Creative Medium, Carpenter Art Center, Harvard University
- 1966, Light in Art, Contemporary Arts Museum Houston
- 1966, Art Electric, Sonnabend Gallery, Paris
- 1966, Wadsworth Atheneum, Hartford, Connecticut
- 1967, Counterpoints, Lever House, New York
- 1968, Howard Wise Gallery
- 1971, Electronic Refractions II, Studio Museum in Harlem, New York
- 1971, Contemporary Black Artists in America, Whitney Museum of American Art
- 2006, Energy/Experimentation, Studio Museum in Harlem, New York
- 2007, Black Light White Noise, Contemporary Arts Museum Houston
- 2019, Black Refractions: Highlights from the Studio Museum in Harlem, traveling exhibition
- 2024–2025, Tom Lloyd - Veleuro, Museum of Modern Art, New York
- 2025, Tom Lloyd, Studio Museum in Harlem
