= Avel de Knight =

American artist

Avel de Knight (1923-1995) born in New York to Barbados and Puerto Rican parents. Avel was an artist, art educator, and art critic. His works are in the collections of the Metropolitan Museum of Art, the Walker Art Center, and the University of Richmond Museums.

== Early life and education ==
De Knight was born in New York. His birth year has been given as 1921, 1923, 1925, 1931, and 1933. His parents immigrated to the United States from Barbados and Puerto Rico. He is the younger brother of René DeKnight.

De Knight studied art at the Pratt Institute from 1941 to 1942. He joined the Army and served in a segregated unit until the end of World War II. In 1946, he moved to Paris, where he used the G.I. Bill to attend the École des Beaux-Arts, Académie de la Grande Chaumière, and the Académie Julian.

== Career ==
De Knight painted watercolors and often practiced the gouache painting technique.

He taught at the Art Students League of New York and the National Academy School of Fine Arts.

== Collections ==
- Metropolitan Museum of Art
- Walker Art Center
- University of Richmond
- Schomburg Center for Research in Black Culture
- The Chrysler Museum of Art
- Lehigh University Art Galleries

== Exhibitions ==
- Afro-American Images 1971: The Vision of Percy Ricks, Delaware Art Museum 2021

== See also ==
- Herbert Gentry
- Romare Bearden
