= Hughie Lee-Smith =

American artist and teacher (1915–1999)

- Born: September 20, 1915; Eustis, Florida, U.S.
- Died: February 23, 1999 (aged 83); Albuquerque, New Mexico
- Education: Cleveland Institute of Art
- Alma mater: Wayne State University
- Known for: Painting

Home, by Hughie Lee-Smith

Reflection, 1957

Hughie Lee-Smith (September 20, 1915 – February 23, 1999) was an American artist and teacher whose surreal paintings often featured distant figures under vast skies, and desolate urban settings.

== Life and career ==
Lee-Smith was born in Eustis, Florida, to Luther and Alice Williams Smith; in art school he altered his last name to sound more distinguished. Shortly after his birth, Lee-Smith's parents divorced and his mother moved to Cleveland, Ohio, to pursue a music career. As a child, Lee-Smith moved to Atlanta to live with his grandmother. She was strict with Lee-Smith, and when carnivals came to town she would not allow him to attend, an event which he describes as an experience which "must have sunk into my unconscious and manifested itself years later in my paintings: the balloons, ribbons, pennants." At the age of 10, he moved to Cleveland to live with his mother and grandmother (once his mother had established her music career), and attended classes at the Cleveland Museum of Art, and later the Cleveland Institute of Art and the John Huntington Polytechnic Institute, the Art School of the Detroit Society of Arts & Crafts (Center For Creative Studies, College of Art & Design)and Wayne State University (BA 1953).

Lee-Smith attended East Technical High School (where he was president of the art club and ran track with Jesse Owens), during the tenure of Harold Hunsicker as head of its art department. As a youth, Lee-Smith was active at Karamu as a dancer, performer, studio enrollee, and teacher trainee.

In 1938, he graduated with honors from the Cleveland School of Art and worked for the Federal Arts Project of the Works Progress Administration (WPA). Like many WPA artists, Lee-Smith was concerned about the contribution art could make to the struggle for social justice and racial equality, and he created a series of lithographs on this theme. Lee-Smith's “The Artist’s Life No.1”, a 1939 lithograph, is one of his early masterpieces. It featured in an exhibition called Hardship to Hope: African American Art from the Karamu Workshop at the Maltz Museum of Jewish Heritage, 2929 Richmond Road, Beachwood, Ohio.

Lee-Smith's first job as an art teacher was at Claflin College in Orangeburg, South Carolina, in 1940. Newly married to Mabel Louise Everett, Lee-Smith returned with his wife to Orangeburg. The pay was so poor for a man with a new bride that Lee-Smith gave up and moved to Detroit. He got a job as a core maker in one of Henry Ford's factories. He worked there for about three years before joining the Navy for a 19-month stint. Stationed at the Great Lakes Naval Training Center north of Chicago, Lee-Smith was one of three African-American artists commissioned to do “morale-building paintings” of Blacks in the Navy. While in the Navy, he painted a mural entitled History of the Negro in the U.S. Navy. He also did portraits of the first Black naval officers.

Lee-Smith and Mabel Louise Everett divorced in 1953. Although the divorce was amicable, it had a “deathlike” impact on Lee-Smith.

After his long journey and hard work, he received a Bachelor of Science degree in Art Education (graduating in 1953) from Wayne State University in Detroit.

Many years after winning a top prize for painting from the Detroit Institute of Arts in 1953, he recalled:

I was no longer called black artist, Negro artist, colored boy. When I won that prize, all of a sudden, there was no longer a racial designation.

In 1958, Lee-Smith moved to New York City, and taught at the Art Students League for 15 years. Later he moved to Cranbury, New Jersey.

His paintings evidenced the influence of Cubism, Social realism, and Surrealism at the service of a personal expression that was poignant and enigmatic. Of his characteristic work, Holland Cotter wrote in The New York Times:

Mr. Lee-Smith's paintings usually have spare settings suggestive of theater stages or bleak urban or seaside landscapes. Walls stretch out under gray skies. Men and women, as lithe as dancers, seem frozen in place. Most are dressed in street clothes; some wear exotic masks. Children frequently appear, as do props reminiscent of circuses. The work has an air of mystery associated with the paintings of Giorgio de Chirico and Edward Hopper.

In 1967, Lee-Smith became an associate member of the National Academy of Design, at the time the second African American to be elected to the Academy, after Henry Ossawa Tanner, and was made a full member four years later. In 1994, he was commissioned to paint the official portrait of David Dinkins, former Mayor of New York City, for the New York City Hall. Retrospectives of Lee-Smith's work were mounted by the New Jersey State Museum and the Studio Museum in Harlem in 1988, and Ogunquit Museum of American Art in 1997. Lee-Smith's works are included in the collections of the Metropolitan Museum of Art, the Smithsonian American Art Museum, the Detroit Institute of Art, Howard University, the San Diego Museum of Art, and Schomburg Center for Research in Black Culture in Manhattan.

Lee-Smith met Patricia Thomas-Ferry, a student at the Art Students League, in the spring of 1978. Late that year, they rented an apartment near the League, and they married a few days before Christmas. This third marriage would be happy and lasting, and the couple would make their home in New Jersey in 1981.

In 1999, Lee-Smith died of cancer in Albuquerque, New Mexico. He was 83.

== Works ==
In 1945, Lee-Smith had his first one-man exhibitions at the South Side Community Art Center and at Snowden Galleries in Chicago.

Paintings

- Man Running 1965, oil on canvas
- End of Act One 1984, Oil on canvas
- Double Exposure 1995, oil on canvas
- Stranger 1957–1958, oil on canvas
- Untitled (Urban Scene) 1955, oil on Masonite
- Bouquet 1949, oil on canvas
- Artist’s Life No.2 1939, Lithograph

Prizes

- Cleveland Museum
  - Freehand Drawing, 3rd Prize, 1938
  - Linoprint, Honourable Mention, 1938
  - Lithography, 3rd Prize, 1939
  - Lithography, 2nd Prize, 1940
- Atlanta University
  - Oil Painting, Purchase Prize, 1943
- Detroit Institute of Art
  - Oil, Anthony Maiuello Prize, 1951
- EMILY LOWE AWARD, Oil, 1957
- Allied Artists of America
  - Oil, Allied Artists Prize, 1958
- American Society of African Culture
  - Oil, 1st Purchase Prize 1960
