= Thomas Sills =

Thomas Sills (August 20, 1914 – September 26, 2000) was an American painter and collagist and a participant in the New York Abstract Expressionist movement. At the peak of his career in the 1960s and 1970s, his work was widely shown in museums. His work was regularly featured in art journals and is in museum collections.

== Biography ==
=== Early years ===
Thomas Sills was born and raised in Castalia, North Carolina. He was born to a family of eleven and would later live with one of his older brothers in Brooklyn. Before he got involved with painting, he worked in a greenhouse in Raleigh, North Carolina, where the color around him made a strong impression on him. He received as much of a formal education as a black child could in rural, segregated North Carolina. Once in New York, he worked as a doorman at Paramount Theater at Dekalb and Flatbrush Avenues in Brooklyn. He returned to Raleigh from 1947-1948 to assist one of his brother's cleaning and pressing services before returning to Brooklyn. Then he worked on the docks as a stevedore three days a week and the rest of the time at a liquor store in Greenwich Village.

=== Career ===
Sills began to experiment in art in 1952, about the time he married the mosaicist and art collector Jeanne Reynal, who was an important member of the surrealist movement in the United States. Self-taught and inspired by Reynal's collection of abstract art, he began working with the materials he found in her mosaic studio, but soon branched out to oil on wood as well as canvas. He originally used items such as magnesite, nails, dirt, rocks, enamel, housepaints, and other items onto wood while experimenting with his style.

Sills spent most of his creative life in New York City, deeply rooted in the artistic trends as well as cultural issues from the early 1950s to 1970s. He knew Willem de Kooning who visited his studio and told him not to throw anything away before anyone had seen it.

Others in the NY circle gave him advice. At the time of his first solo show, Barnett Newman sent him a letter of congratulations. His friendships with Newman and Mark Rothko placed him at the intellectual center of the Abstract Expressionist movement, but like de Kooning, Arshile Gorky and Franz Kline, Sills believed that it was not necessary to explain his art; he painted what he felt and it came from within.

Through his exploratory approach to materials, Sills was able to release phantasmical abstract paintings. Intrigued by the light quality of mosaics, a similar luminosity emerged in Sill's bright oil compositions. His provocative handling of color and innovative use of media attracted the attention of the New York avant-garde. His work was a rejection of the prim and proper of the European avant-garde that traditionally dominated Western art.

Sills's regular presence in the art world of the 1950s through the early 1970s as an African-American painter situated him as an integral element of the mainstream and African-American art. Thomas Sills perceived his art to be beyond the political. He found in art a form of expression for the dynamism that escapes any formal constraints. Sills' work was highly intuitive and he too sought inspiration from indigenous art—in the 1950s he made frequent trips to Mexico to study the sculptures, frescos and architecture of Chiapas and the Yucatan. He would also travel widely around the world to Peru, England, Russia, France, Italy, Spain, and other countries, influencing his work.

At the peak of his career in the 1960s and 1970s, his work was widely shown in museums and his work was regularly featured in art journals. His work was exhibited in Encore, Five Abstract Expressionists at Sidney Mishkin Gallery of Baruch College, The City University of New York in 2006.

His work is featured in numerous collections nationally, including The Metropolitan Museum of Art, The Whitney Museum of American Art, the Museum of Modern Art, the San Francisco Museum Modern of Art, the Brooklyn Museum of Art, the High Museum of Art, the Studio Museum in Harlem, and the Newark Museum.

=== Death and legacy ===
Thomas Sills died on September 26, 2000, in New York City at the age of 86. The Estate of Thomas Sills is represented by Eric Firestone Gallery.

== Selected solo exhibitions ==
- Eric Firestone Gallery, New York, NY, Thomas Sills: Variegations, Paintings 1950s–70s, 2022
- Corcoran Fine Arts, Cleveland, OH, Thomas Sills Retrospective Exhibition, 2005
- Art Association of Newport, Newport, RI (solo) 1972

== Collections ==
- San Francisco Museum of Modern Art, CA: 1 piece (as of June 2021)
- Metropolitan Museum of Art, NY: 1 piece (as of June 2021)
- Los Angeles County Museum, CA
- Museum of Modern Art, NY: 1 piece (as of June 2021)
- Rose Art Museum, Waltham, Massachusetts: 1 piece (as of June 2021)
- Williams College Museum of Art, Williamstown, Massachusetts: 1 painting (as of March 2023)

== Bibliography ==
- Allen, S. A. (1972), "Introduction."
- Archives of American Art Journal, 11 ( nos. 1–4, 1971): 33
- Archives of American Art (1977), Checklist, 100 items plus one restricted item.
- Art Digest, Newsletter 4 (May 1, 1969): 6
- Art Gallery, 13 (April 1970): 16A, 28: 35; 40–41.
- Art Gallery, 14 (March 1971): 69–70, Pertinent and Impertinent: Mosaicist. On Jeanne Reynal, wife of Sills; mentions him, pp. 69 – 70.
- Art Gallery, 15 (March 1972): 32–36. "Eye on New York." Mentions Sills solo at Bodley Gallery, p. 33; illus.
- Art Gallery, March 15, 1972). "Guide."
- Art News, 17 articles 1955–74
- Art News, 69, March 1970.
- Brooklyn College (1969), Afro-American Artists Since 1950: April 15 – May 18, 1969, New York, NY: Brooklyn College. (Exhibition Catalog)
- Campbell, L. "The Flowering of Thomas Sills" in Art News, March 1972
- Campbell, L. and Sills, T. (1964), Sills, Chicago: William and Noma Copley Foundation.
- Cederholm, T. (1973), Afro-American Artists, A Bio-bibliographical Survey, Boston: Trustees of the Boston Library.
- Craig, R. J. (1969), Afro-American Artists, 1800–1969: December 5–29, 1969, Philadelphia, PA: School District and Museum of the Philadelphia Civic Center. (Exhibition Catalog)
- Dover, Cedric. American Negro Art, 1960, p. 48 & 183, pl. 91
- Fine, E. H. (1973), The Afro-American artist: A search for identity, New York: Holt, Rinehart and Winston.
- Fine, E. H. (1981), The African American artist : A search for identity, New York: Hacker Art Books.
- Gaither, E. B. (1970), Afro-American Artists: New York and Boston: May 19 – June 23, 1970, Boston, MA: Museum of the National Center of Afro-American Artists. (Exhibition Catalog)
- Holmes, O. N. (1993?, 1973), Black artists in America : part three: Romare Bearden, Selma Burke, Elton C. Fax, Palmer Hayden, Richard Mayhew, Thomas Sills, and Charles White, Alexandria, Va. : Oakley N. Holmes, [1990?, 1973] Edition: VHS video.
- Igoe, L. M. (1981), 250 Years of Afro-American Art – An Annotated Bibliography. New York, NY
- Jeffries, R. (1974), Directions in Afro-American Art: September 18 – October 27, 1974, Ithaca, NY: Herbert F. Johnson Museum of Art, Cornell University. (Exhibition Catalog)
- Jones, K. (1989), Abstract Expressionism: The Missing Link, New York: Studio Museum in Harlem.
- K., I. C. (1957), "The Surprise of Painter Tom Sills," The Village Voice, p. 17
- Kenkeleba House (1991)The Search for Freedom: African American Abstract Painting, 1945 – 1975, New York: Kenkeleba House.
- Kraskin, S. (2006), Encore : Five Abstract Expressionists : Amaranth Ehrenhalt, Leonard Nelson, Jeanne Reynal, Thomas Sills, and Ary Stillman, New York: Sidney Mishkin Gallery, Baruch College.
- Mandle, R. (1986), 30 Contemporary Black Artists: October 17 – November 24, 1968, Minneapolis, MN: Minneapolis Institute of Arts. (Exhibition Catalog)
- Montgomery, E. "Thomas Sills – An Interesting Artistic Life" in Thomas Albert Sills (1914–2000): A Retrospective of the Work, Cleveland, OH: Corcoran Fine Arts Limited, Inc. (gallery brochure)
- Paul Kantor Gallery (1962), Thomas Sills : May 14 – June 2, 1962, Beverly Hills, CA: Paul Kantor Gallery.
- RISD Museum of Art (1969), Contemporary Black Artists: July 1–31, 1969, Providence, RI: Museum of Art, Rhode Island School of Design.
- Pictures on Exhibits, 30 (5): "Exhibition at the Betty Parsons Gallery"
- Rose, M. A. (2010), African American Abstract Artists New York: Anita Shapolsky Gallery (Gallery Catalog)
- Sims, L. S. (2000), "Thomas A. Sills: A Eulogy" in Thomas Albert Sills (1914–2000): A Retrospective of the Work, Cleveland, OH: Corcoran Fine Arts Limited, Inc. (gallery brochure)
- Campbell, Lawrence (1964), Sills, William and Noma Copley Foundation, Chicago IL.
- Spradley, Mary Mace (1980), In Black and White: Afro-Americans in Print, Kalamazoo, MI: Kalamazoo Public Library
- Smithsonian Archives of American Art, Oral History Collection. Interview with Thomas A. Sills, conducted 1968 July 13 by Henri Ghent
- New York Times, Thomas Sills, Obituaries, October 2, 2000.
- Waters, Jerry C. (1982), Directions in Afro-American Abstract Art: October 17 – November 17, 1982, Nashville, TN: Van Vechten Gallery, Fisk University. (Exhibition Catalog)
- Who's Who in American Art, Vol. III, p. 3031 (1999).
