= Raymond Saunders (artist) =

American artist (1934–2025)

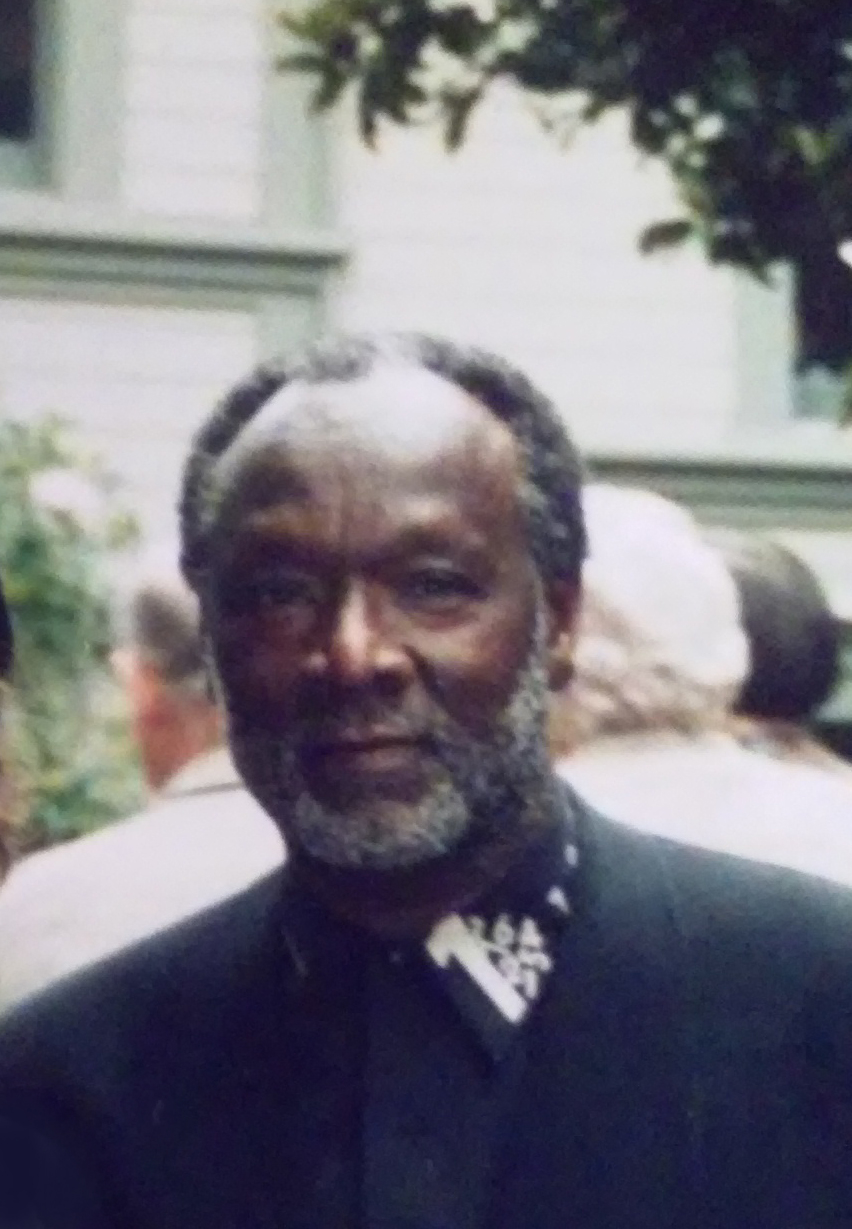
- Saunders in 1995
- Born: October 28, 1934; Homestead, Pennsylvania, U.S.
- Died: July 19, 2025 (aged 90); Oakland, California, U.S.
- Education: Carnegie Institute of Technology; California College of Arts and Crafts
- Known for: Painting
- Awards: Rome Prize (1964); Guggenheim Fellowship (1976); National Endowment for the Arts (1977, 1984)

Raymond Jennings Saunders (October 28, 1934 – July 19, 2025) was an American visual artist known for his multimedia paintings which often have sociopolitical undertones, and which incorporate assemblage, drawing, collage and found text. Saunders is also recognized for his installation, sculpture, and curatorial work.

== Early life and education ==
Raymond Jennings Saunders was born in Homestead, Pennsylvania, near Pittsburgh, on October 28, 1934. He attended Pittsburgh's public school system. It was there that he met Joseph Fitzpatrick, an art teacher who encouraged Saunders to pursue art. Saunders received a Bachelor of Fine Arts degree at Carnegie Institute of Technology in 1960. He trained at the Pennsylvania Academy of Fine Arts on a scholarship and studied at the Barnes Foundation before going on to earn his Master of Fine Arts degree from California College of the Arts in 1961.

== Career ==
Saunders lived and worked primarily in Oakland, California. Saunders was a past professor of painting at California College of the Arts, Oakland, and professor at California State University, East Bay, in Hayward, California.

Saunders worked in a large variety of media, but is mainly known for work that encompasses painting and transversal media juxtaposition, sometimes bordering on the sculptural (as in Pieces of Visual Thinking, 1987) but always retaining the relation to the flat wall key to modernism in painting. Saunders' painting is expressive, and often incorporates collage (mostly small bits of printed paper found in everyday life), chalked words (sometimes crossed out), and other elements that add references and texture without breaking the strong abstract compositional structure. This lends a sense of social narrative to even his abstract work which sets it apart from artists like Robert Rauschenberg, Jim Dine, or Cy Twombly, with which it has obvious affinities.

In 1967, Saunders declared "black is a color". Throughout his career Saunders has questioned the premise that black artists produce something that should be uniquely identified as "black art". In his own work, he looked to separate his practice from the restrictions of identity-driven art, "I am an artist. I do not believe that art work should be limited or categorized by one's racial background."

Besides his painting, Saunders is known for his late 1960s pamphlet Black is a Color, which argues against metaphoric uses of the concept "black" in both the mainstream abstract and conceptual art world and Black Nationalist cultural writing of the time.

== Personal life and death ==
Saunders died from aspiration pneumonia at a hospital in Oakland on July 19, 2025, at the age of 90.

== Exhibitions ==
Saunders had his debut New York solo in 1962. He had one painting, "Night Poetry," in the Third Philadelphia Arts Festival in 1962.

In the late 1960s, he was represented by the Terry Dintenfass Gallery and had a one-man show in 1966, in an era when New York art galleries were almost exclusively exhibiting white men.

He exhibited internationally, spending time in Paris and exhibiting at the Latin Quarter's Galerie Resche. International exhibits of his work have included venues in France, Germany, Switzerland, Denmark, Singapore, Korea, Japan, China.

He was included in "Thirty Contemporary Black Artists," at the San Francisco Museum of Art in 1969.

His work appeared in two Whitney Museum exhibits: "Contemporary Black Artists in America" in 1971; and "1972 Annual Exhibition: Contemporary American Painting."

Saunders's work was included in the 2025 exhibition Photography and the Black Arts Movement, 1955–1985 at the National Gallery of Art.

Saunders' painting of Jack Johnson (1972), now in the Philadelphia Museum of Art), was used as the cover of Powell's Black Art and Culture in the 20th Century. He had a one-show at the Pennsylvania Academy of the Fine Arts in 1974.

Saunders work was highlighted in "Aesthetics of Graffiti" (1978) at the San Francisco Museum of Modern Art. In 1981 an eponymously titled show of his work was mounted at the Seattle Art Museum.

== Collections ==
Saunders' works are in the collections of major institutions including the Museum of Modern Art, the National Gallery of Art, and the Pennsylvania Academy of the Fine Arts, Other collections he is included in are the Achenbach Foundation for Graphic Arts at the Legion of Honor (San Francisco, California), the Carnegie Museum of Art (Pittsburgh, Pennsylvania, the Crocker Art Museum (Sacramento, California), Howard University (Washington, D.C.), the Metropolitan Museum of Art (New York, New York), the M. H. de Young Memorial Museum (San Francisco, California), the Museum of Contemporary Art (Los Angeles, California),the San Francisco Museum of Modern Art (San Francisco, California), the Walker Art Center, (Minneapolis, Minnesota), and the Whitney Museum of American Art(New York, New York).

== Awards ==
In 1964 Saunders was awarded a Rome Prize Fellowship in painting. He was awarded a Guggenheim Fellowship in 1976 and two National Endowment for the Arts Awards the first in 1977, the second in 1984. In 1988 he was a recipient of the 9th annual Awards in the Visual Arts.

In 1976, Saunders was awarded an aforementioned Guggenheim Fellowship, given to individuals in many different fields and creation under any art form. This fellowship allowed Saunders to create many works, possibly his works after 1976. Many of his pieces used objects that were recycled and given a new purpose within his art. Other awards include the National Endowment for the Arts Award (1977 and 1984), as well as the Schwabcher Frey Award by the San Francisco Museum of Modern Art. The National Endowments for the Arts Award is a very prestigious honor, as only a handful are given out per year, and it is recognized as one of the largest awards to receive as an artist in America.

== Curatorial projects ==
Saunders curated Paris Connections in 1992 at San Francisco's Bomani Gallery. He also curated American Color: A Late 20th Century Perspective at Louis Stern Fine Arts in 1995.

== Political and social commentary ==
Saunders' work overall combines expressionism and abstraction with his own personal ideas and experiences. His paintings pick up on these influences within their background, busy surfaces, and suggestion of race. Going through the Pittsburgh public school system, Saunders continued to use iconic suggestions of blackboards and chalk within his pieces. Additionally, Saunders uses his familiarity with Jazz to distort the underlying commentary in his pieces. With intertwining details of his history as well as popular narratives, Saunders expresses imbalances and stability within the black community in an urban area.

Relating to Black art history as a whole, Saunders was one of the many black artists who worked from his personal experience. Although, he had an extreme distaste for critics who grouped black artists together as social commentators. In his article "Black is a Color", Saunders argues that grouping these artists who discuss social misconduct within the black community does more harm than good. This idea of the Model minority has been prevalent in many other art movements, as it is sometimes seen as a minority's responsibility to pronounce their experience and establish a change.

Saunders, in a 1994 interview with SFMOMA, stated his ideas of the artistic process, and breaking away from any niche critics put him within. He states that "[anything] other than what you think you accomplished, is really not important" in which the processes the artist takes and what they believe the true meaning of the piece is solely what is important. This idea of the artists' reflection on their work coincides with the prior ideas shared in "Black is a Color". Additionally, Saunders argues that "the way that I work, it is by design and by default" and that the process of making art and practice of becoming an artist is what makes an artwork special.
