= Reginald Gammon (American artist) =

American artist (1921–2005)

Reginald Adolphus Gammon
- Born: March 31, 1921; Philadelphia, Pennsylvania, U.S.
- Died: November 4, 2005 (aged 84); Albuquerque, New Mexico
- Education: Philadelphia Museum School of Industrial Art
- Known for: Painter, educator
- Website: reggiegammon.com

Reginald Gammon (March 31, 1921 – November 4, 2005) was an American artist and member of the African-American artist's collective, Spiral.

== Biography ==
Gammon was born on March 31, 1921, in Philadelphia, Pennsylvania. He attended the Philadelphia Museum School of Industrial Art. Gammon served in the United States Navy during World War II stationed in Guam from 1944 through 1946.

After the war, Gammon located to New York City. In 1963, joined Spiral, a collective of Black artists interested in incorporating the concerns of the civil rights movement into their art. The group met at the artist Romare Bearden's studio and the name Spiral was suggested by Hale Woodruff. Gammon's black and white painting "Freedom Now", based on a Moneta Sleet Jr. photograph of the 1963 March on Washington, was exhibited at the 1965 Spiral exhibition First Group Showing: Works in Black and White.

After Spiral dissolved in 1966, Gammon joined the Black Emergency Cultural Coalition (BECC) a group of artists that picketed the Metropolitan Museum of Art and the Whitney Museum to protest the exclusion of black artists.

In 1970, Gammon left (BECC) and New York City to take a teaching job at Western Michigan University where he stayed until he retired in 1991 as professor emeritus Gammon then moved to Albuquerque, New Mexico, where he became a member of the New Mexico Afro-American Artist Guild and the New Grounds Print Workshop.

In 1975, Gammon was the recipient of a MacDowell fellowship.

Gammon died on November 4, 2005, in Albuquerque.

Gammon' work was included in the 2015 exhibition We Speak: Black Artists in Philadelphia, 1920s-1970s at the Woodmere Art Museum. His work is in the collection of the National Gallery of Art, the Columbus Museum of Art, the Woodmere Art Museum, and the Pennsylvania Academy of the Fine Arts. His papers are in the Archives of American Art at the Smithsonian Institution.
