= Felrath Hines =

American painter

- Born: Samuel Felrath Hines Jr. November 9, 1913; Indianapolis, Indiana
- Died: October 3, 1993 (aged 79); Silver Spring, Maryland
- Education: John Herron School of Art Saturday School, New York University, Pratt Institute
- Notable work: Three Figures, 1947
- Movement: Spiral
- Spouse: Dorothy C. Fisher

Felrath Hines (born as Samuel Felrath Hines Jr.; November 9, 1913 – October 3, 1993) was an African American visual artist and art conservator. Hines served as a conservator at several institutions, including the Hirshhorn Museum and Sculpture Garden in Washington, D.C. He was a member of the Spiral collective and a contemporary of Romare Bearden. Hines' paintings can be found in the collection of the Smithsonian American Art Museum.

== Early life and education ==
Born in Indianapolis, Indiana, in 1913, Hines began studying art in 1926 after receiving a scholarship for youth classes at the John Herron School of Art Saturday School. After graduating Crispus Attucks High School in 1931, Hines worked for the Civilian Conservation Corps as a firefighter and subscribed to correspondence courses in art. In 1940, he was employed as a railroad dining car waiter for the Chicago and North Western Transportation Company, saving money for art classes at the Art Institute of Chicago.

== Career ==
In 1946, Hines moved to New York City. From 1947 to 1948, he took private classes with Nahum Tschacbasov, a Russian-born American painter. He also worked as a fashion designer and took classes at New York University and the Pratt Institute.

Hines' paintings have been associated with the De Stijl movement often containing strong design elements, inspired by Cubism and the simplicity of Piet Mondrian. His work moved from semi-abstract landscapes in the 1940s and 1950s to geometric abstracts, and is recognized in the Black Abstractionism canon. As Hines became more influenced by American modernists, such as Stuart Davis, Ad Reinhardt, Josef Albers, Ellsworth Kelly, and Barnett Newman, he began to eliminate line from his compositions, focusing instead on simple shapes and a restrained color palette.

In 1963, Hines joined a club of sixteen African-American artists called Spiral, which had been formed by Romare Bearden. Spiral was a loosely structured group of black artists, ranging in age from twenty-eight to sixty-five and in style from minimalism to realism, who sponsored an exhibit of black and white artwork for symbolic reasons. Billy Strayhorn, the jazz musician, was the first person to purchase one of Hines’ paintings.

Despite Hines' involvement with Spiral, he wanted his imagery to remain universal and not to be seen as having relevance exclusively to black social causes or to African Americans. As a result, he refused to participate in the Whitney Museum of Art's landmark exhibition Contemporary Black Artists in America.

=== Art conservation ===
In addition to his artwork, Hines was a noted art conservator. He interned with Robert Kulicke, a master framer in New York. Hines completed a two-year apprenticeship with Caroline and Sheldon Keck, founders of the Conservation Center at New York University Institute of Fine Arts. Hines assisted the Kecks in conserving Claude Monet's Water Lilies, which were housed at the Museum of Modern Art.

From 1962 to 1964, Hines was a supervisor at NYU's Fine Arts Laboratories, and left that position to start his private art conservation business. His conservation clients included his friend and artist Georgia O'Keeffe, and the Corcoran Gallery of Art, Museum of Modern Art, and Whitney Museum of American Art.

In 1972, Hines was appointed Chief Conservator of the Smithsonian Institution's National Portrait Gallery. He later worked at the Hirshhorn Museum and Sculpture Garden, and retired as chief conservator in 1984.

After his retirement and until his death in 1993, Hines produced more paintings than the rest of his career combined.

== Personal ==
Hines was married to Dorothy C. Fisher, the executor of his estate. Fisher, in order to preserve Hines' work after his death, donated several of his paintings to museums and university art galleries.

Hines is commemorated by a State Historical Marker, installed at Crispus Attucks High School by Indiana Humanities in April 2023.

== Collections ==
Hines' works are included in several public and private collections, including the Ackland Art Museum, Chrysler Museum of Art, Detroit Institute of Arts, Fort Wayne Museum of Art, Museum of Fine Arts Houston, Nasher Museum of Art, North Carolina Central University Art Museum, and Smithsonian American Art Museum.

== Select exhibitions ==
- Color Balance: Paintings by Felrath Hines, Ackland Museum; Nasher Museum of Art; and North Carolina Central Art Museum, 2010.
- A Universal Language: The Art of Felrath Hines, Indiana State Museum, 2019.
- Felrath Hines: A Personal Pursuit, Spanierman Modern, New York, 2024–2025.
