= Abstract art by African-American artists =

Modern arts movement

African-American artists have created various forms of abstract art in a wide range of mediums, including painting, sculpture, collage, drawing, graphics, ceramics, installation, mixed media, craft, and decorative arts, presenting the viewer with abstract expression, imagery, and ideas instead of representational imagery. Abstract art by African-American artists has been widely exhibited and studied.

== Black artists and abstract art ==
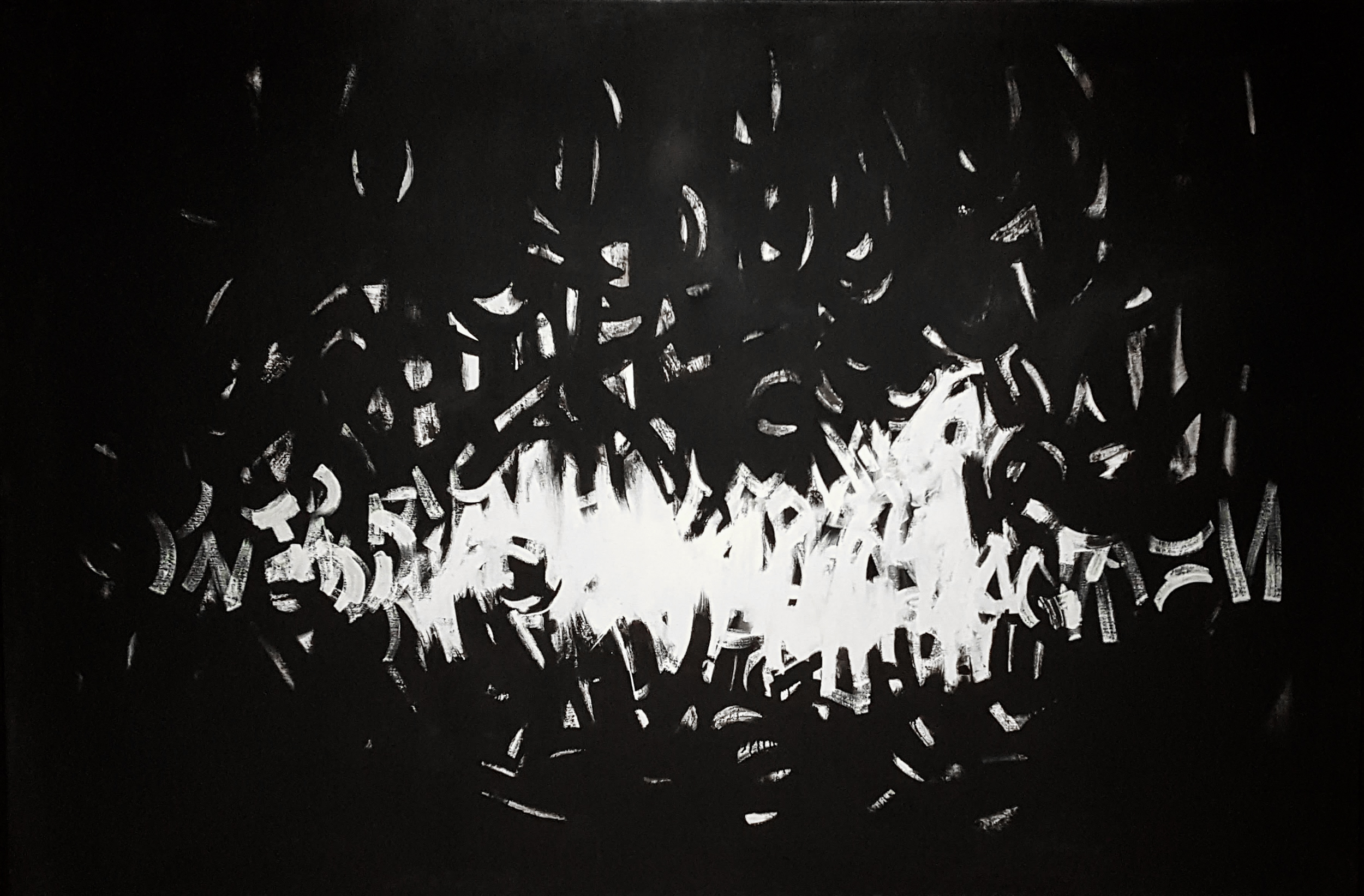
Norman Lewis "Alabama" (1960) Cleveland Museum of Art

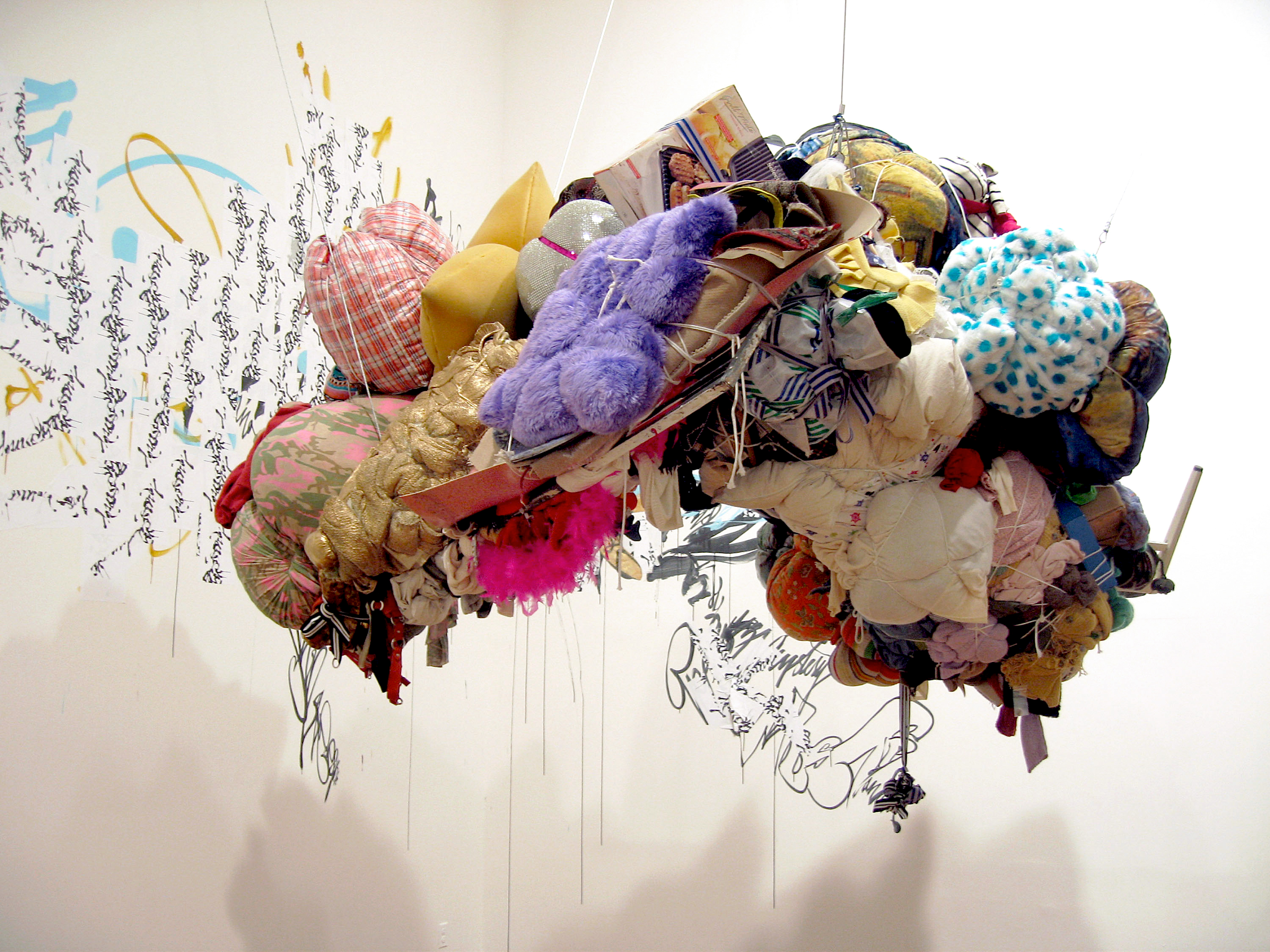
Shinique Smith "Arcadian Cluster" (2006) Sculpture: clothes, fabrics, acrylic, collage, bindings, and found objects

Many artists have claimed responsibility for creating the first piece of abstract art, given the "non-representational" and “non-objective" subject matter of the work. Between November 1906 and March 1907, Hilma af Klint created a series of abstract paintings, "Primordial Chaos". In 1909, Francis Picabia painted "Caoutchouc". A year later, Wassily Kandinsky signed "1910" to one of his abstract watercolors, "Composition VII", although many researchers believe that the work was actually created in 1913; Kandinsky may have backdated his work to claim credit for being the first abstract artist in modern art history unaware of af Klint and Picabia's works.

The first Black artist to be recognized for creating an abstract work is just as interesting; the challenge with the abstract work associated with black artists is that "it did not announce itself as Black art." Black abstract artists faced all of the same aesthetic, intellectual, and value questions that other abstract artists faced and also had to confront individual and institutional biases regarding content as it related to black abstract signals and symbols. Lowery Stokes Sims, the former president of Studio Museum in Harlem and the first Black curator at the Metropolitan Museum of Art, proposed that abstraction originated from African art, and that Black artists are claiming their birthright through abstraction.

The glaring omission of Black artists is evident throughout American art history. Many black artists felt marginalized in the white-dominated art world. Museum leaders and gallery owners were rarely interested in the work of Black artists. In the 1700s and 1800s, Black artists created work that did not reflect “the Black experience" in their subject matter; they painted portraits of white families and sweeping landscapes of white owned lands as a way to make money as an artist, which could be interpreted as the “Black experience” for artists during this period. Black artists played a pivotal role in the growth of contemporary art of the 1920s to 1940s, yet they existed on the outskirts of the art world in the United States. During the mid-20th century, several Black artists created nonrepresentational and abstract work, including Robert Blackburn, Frank Bowling, Ed Clark, Fred Eversley, Norman Lewis, and Tom Lloyd, during the Abstract Expressionism movement. Since the 1950s, the understanding and presenting of abstract work by Black artists has been a major movement in African American and American art history. By the 1970s, the American art world was evenly split between Black artists who created representational and political work, and artists who investigated "abstract strategies."

Howardena Pindell and her abstractions were rejected by the Studio Museum in Harlem, encouraging her to "go downtown and show with the white boys", and scolded for making work that was "not sufficiently black". Black American women artists represent 0.5 percent of museum and gallery acquisitions. Historically, the Black Arts Movement focused on a racial equality narrative and viewed abstraction as a reflection of inequality, a privilege of the rich, and frowned on abstract work that was viewed as not contributing to racial justice. Black Abstractionism and the art that it represents was motivated by an attraction to blackness, embracing the discovery of “strategic abstraction” for all of its blackest possibilities, and enabling an artist to avoid "corporeal materializations".

In recent years, art historians, museum curators, and gallery dealers have shown increased interest in Black abstract painters and sculptors. These artists and their works expand the study of art, art history, and art as a commodity, yet Black artists are often relegated to museum basement showings and limited-run exhibitions. Black visual artists represent 2.2 percent of museum acquisitions, 6.3 percent of museum exhibitions, and less than two percent of the $187 billion global art market, according to a 2022 report surveying thirty-one museums in the United States.

== History ==
=== 1920s ===
As part of "The Negro in Art Week" (1927), the Art Institute of Chicago presented a Chicago Woman's Club organized exhibit featuring more than 100 artworks from the Blondiau-Theatre Arts Collection of Primitive African Art and examples of modern and contemporary art, including abstraction, portraiture, realism, and ritualism. The exhibition catalogue was designed by Charles C. Dawson. The Negro in Art Week: Exhibition of Primitive African Sculpture, Modern Paintings, Sculpture, Drawings, Applied Art, and Books, is considered to be the first major museum show of Black artists in the United States.

In 1929, the Smithsonian in Washington, DC hosted on the ground floor of the U.S. National Museum building, "American Negro Artists", and included artists such as Palmer Hayden, Archibald Motley, and others.

In New York, the Harlem Renaissance, or New Negro Movement of the 1920s, attempted to redefine the meaning of blackness, the Black experience, and Black art and established black abstract, objective, and representational art as central to modern art history. From 1928 to 1933, the Harmon Foundation hosted five shows featuring Black artists. These exhibits and the annual Harmon Foundation awards were high-profile opportunities for Black artists.

=== 1930s ===
In the early 1930s, Aaron Douglas created paintings that were "geometric symbolism", abstract, flat, and not adhering to standard conventions. His murals at Fisk University provided HBCU students with daily exposure to art and the work of a black artist. During the Great Depression, Americans viewed art more conservatively and grew suspicious of abstract images and art, some thinking that abstract images were propaganda of foreign countries. Some may view abstract art as difficult to understand, yet black abstract artists have a history of using abstraction to speak to real situations.

In 1933, the Smithsonian presented Exhibition of Works by Negro Artists, a show sponsored by the Association for the Study of Negro Life and History.

Sargent Claude Johnson was creating abstract work that married geometric shapes and forms rooted in African aesthetics as early as 1934. A pioneer in the New Negro movement, Johnson's copper and enamel Mask (1934) was exhibited at The Met’s Harlem Renaissance and Transatlantic Modernism exhibition in 2024. In 1945, he created two abstract pieces, "Breakfast", an oil painting, and "Lovers", a terracotta sculpture, that are housed in the Melvin Holmes Collection of African American Art.

In 1935, the Museum of Modern Art hosted African Negro Art, a show that featured a variety of African sculptures and masks, as well Belgian Congolese abstract tufted cloth patterns, on loan from the Collection Henri-Matisse in Nice, France.

In 1936, the Texas Centennial Exposition, the first world's fair held in the Southwest, showcased the Hall of Negro Life, the first recognition of black culture at a world's fair. The Hall of Negro Life attracted more than 400,000 visitors, who entered through a lobby featuring murals by Aaron Douglas, a modern abstract painter who played a key role in the Harlem Renaissance. The Hall of Negro Life showcased works on loan from the Harmon Foundation, including paintings, sculpture, and graphic art work by modern, figurative and representational artists, including Richmond Barthé, Leslie Boling, Hilda Brown, Samuel A. Countee, Allen Rohan Crite, Arthur Diggs, Aaron Douglas, Palmer Hayden, Malvin Gray Johnson, Sargent Johnson, Henry Letcher, Archibald J. Motley, Jr., Henry Ossawa Tanner, Laura Wheeler Waring, James L. Wells, and Hale Woodruff. In addition, Edna Manley created "Pocomania", a sculpture that features abstract and representative qualities in 1936.

In 1939, the Baltimore Museum of Art presented Contemporary Negro Art, a major museum exhibition. Samuel Joseph Brown’s “Temperance”, an abstraction, was featured in the exhibition catalog. In addition to Brown, the participating artists included Charles Alston, Richmond Barthé, Robert Blackburn, Aaron Douglas, Elton Clay Fax, Rex Goreleigh, Palmer C. Hayden, William Hayden, Louise E. Jefferson, Wilmer Jennings, Malvin Gray Johnson, Sargent Johnson, Lois Mailou Jones, Ronald Joseph, Jacob Lawrence, Norman Lewis, Richard Lindsey, Ronald Moody, Archibald Motley, Jr., Robert Neal, Albert Alexander Smith, Dox Thrash, James Lesesne Wells, Hale Woodruff, and others. Contemporary Negro Art ran for two weeks in February during Black History Month (then referred to as "Negro History Week") and attracted more than 10,000 visitors.

Charles White, a skilled artist in multiple artistic mediums, played a major role in the Chicago Renaissance during the 1930s and 1940s. The Chicago Renaissance featured artists working in varying styles, from abstraction to figurative and portraiture.

=== 1940s ===
Harlem Renaissance painter Beauford Delaney’s early abstract works predate the Abstract Expressionism movement. His 1941 abstract oil, "The Burning Bush", was created before World War II, and his 1946 abstract painting, “Greene Street”, was inspired by his Greenwich Village neighborhood.

In 1942, Hale Woodruff initiated Exhibitions of Paintings, Sculpture, and Prints by Negro Artists in America, an annual juried show that included a cash prize at Clark Atlanta University. The exhibit would be held every year until 1970, and featured the work of approximately 900 Black artists working in various forms, including abstraction.

In 1943, the Art Institute of Chicago sponsored The Room of Chicago Art: Paintings and Sculpture by Negro Artists, an exhibit that featured 21 works art that were on loan from the Parkway Center and Southside Community Center in Chicago. Participating artists included Henry Avery, Eldzier Cortor, Archibald Motley, Marion Perkins, Charles Sebree, Charles White, and others. That same year, the Mountain View Officers' Club at Fort Huachuca, a predominantly black military base during World War II, presented Exhibition of the Work of 37 Negro Artists, featuring drawings, paintings, and sculptures.

In 1944, The G. Place Gallery (Washington, DC) organized The Renaissance Society at the University of Chicago's exhibit, New Names in American Art: Recent Contributions to Painting and Sculpture by Negro Artists, that featured 36 artists, including those who would be recognized for their work in abstraction. The exhibit originated at the Hampton Institute, appeared at the Baltimore Museum of Art, and travelled to other cities after Chicago. Also, in 1944, the Museum of Modern Art presented Twelve New Acquisitions in American Painting, an exhibition of "variously realist, romantic, expressionist and abstract" work; Junius Redwood, a Black artist from Columbus, Ohio, who went to school at Hampton, was the youngest artist in the exhibition, represented by his 1941 oil "Night Scene".

Norman Lewis, who began his career as a social realist painter, participated in the Artists’ Sessions lecture series at Studio 35 in New York, that became “Subjects of the Artist School", signaling that abstract art was a serious field of study. Lewis was one of the first Black abstract artists to exhibit at Museum of Modern Art. His 1940s jazz-inspired abstract paintings would lay the foundation for Black Abstractionism. Many abstract artists embraced the blues, jazz, and bebop as their guide for improvisation, lyricism and spontaneity, and the recognition of Black artists who worked in abstraction runs parallel to the northward migration of the blues, jazz, and bebop. Lewis’ abstract jazz images place his work in the center of the Abstract Expressionism movement, and he was the only Black artist among the first generation of Abstract Expressionists.

In 1948, Robert Blackburn, a Black graphic artist, opened the Printmaking Workshop, a 8,000 square foot studio in Chelsea. A product of Harlem, Edwards designed and printed some of the most influential abstract and pop art prints of the 20th century.

=== 1950s ===
Abstract expressionism, Gestural abstraction, and realism were three dominant artistic styles in the 1950s. Ed Clark began creating work with nontraditional painting items, such as brooms, rollers, rags, and hands, to complete his canvases. His "push broom technique" allowed him to expand how and where he could apply paint to a surface. In 1957, Clark is credited with being the first artist of any race to exhibit a non-traditional, shaped canvas, presenting his work at Brata Gallery, a New York City cooperative he co-founded with Al Held, Yayoi Kusama, and others.

Also during this decade painter Norman Lewis was deeply embedded in the abstract expressionist movement and his 1953 painting "Migrating Birds" won the "Popular Prize" at the 1955 Carnegie International.

=== 1960s ===
1n 1963 Romare Bearden, Norman Lewis, Charles Alston, and Hale Woodruff initiated the Spiral group. in the wake of The March on Washington for Jobs and Freedom in August of that year. The group was convened in order to discuss their views and feelings on the Civil Rights movement and to caucus on their individual and collective responses to the movement for social justice. Other members of the group included Emma Amos (the only female in the group), Calvin Douglass, Perry Ferguson, Reginald Gammon, Felrath Hines, Alvin Hollingsworth, William Majors, Richard Mayhew, Earl Miller, Merton D. Simpson, and James Yeargans. The group mounted only one exhibition, that being in 1965 in New York City's Greenwich Village and disbanded soon thereafter.

In 1967, Romare Bearden and Carroll Greene, Jr. co-curated The Evolution of Afro-American Artists 1800-1950, an exhibition organized by the City University of New York and held at Great Hall at the City College of New York, which featured the work of several artists working in abstraction.

In 1968 and 1969, Studio Museum in Harlem organized and opened Invisible Americans, Black Artists of the '30s, as a show in protest at the Whitney Museum's The 1930s: Painting and Sculpture in America that did not include one Black artist. The Studio Museum show included works by more than twenty artists, including School of Paris-inspired abstract works by printmaker Ronald Joseph and painter Archibald Motley, two artist who were normally associated with representational work.

In 1968, William T. Williams along with Melvin Edwards, Guy Ciarcia, and Billy Rose, founded Smokehouse Associates. For more than two years, Smokehouse filled vacant lots, barren walls, pocket parks, and neighborhood grocery store signs with abstract murals and sculptures as a way to engage the residents of and visitors to Harlem. The group presented abstract geometrical forms and uneven forms to promote community engagement with ultimate goal of inspiring Harlem residents to create art that would enhance their neighborhood. Ironically, an artist viewing William T. Williams' 1969 abstract painting "Trane" that was included in the Soul of a Nation: Art in the Age of Black Power exhibition that covered the period from 1963 to 1983, remarked: "That painting ('Trane') has nothing to do with being Black."

In the years surrounding the Smokehouse murals in Harlem, several artists, including Sam Gilliam, Alvin Loving, and Jack Whitten, among others, were expanding the boundaries of Black art and abstraction. Painters were moving away from scenes of real events or the "outer world", and delving into abstract explanations of their souls or “inner world”. In response to the assassination of Martin Luther King Jr., Sam Gilliam stained a large canvas with hot pinks and reds, draped it, and titled the work, “Red April”, a reference to the blood of a dead black man. Gilliam, the first Black artist to represent the United States in the Venice Biennale, is recognized as the first modern artist of any race to create canvas work that is not supported by a frame. In addition, abstract painter Alvin Loving was given a solo exhibition at the Whitney Museum of American Art in 1969, the first black artist to receive a one-person show at the Whitney. As well, Jack Whitten, who invented "forms of abstraction", created a series of squeegee paintings years before Gerhard Richter adopted that style of abstract painting.

Frank Bowling organized the 5+1 exhibition at Stony Brook University and the Princeton University Art Museum in 1969. Five Black abstract artists born in the United States, Melvin Edwards, Daniel LaRue Johnson, Al Loving, Jack Whitten, and William T. Williams, and Bowling, who was born in British Guiana, were featured in the exhibit, hence the "Five plus One". Years later, the MFA Boston developed a partnership with undergraduates at UMass Boston and PhD researchers at Stony Brook University to delve into the historical significance of 5+1 — then and now – with satellite exhibitions at UMass Boston (2022) and Stony Brook University (2023).

In 1969, Charles McGee opened Gallery 7, a Detroit, Michigan exhibition space dedicated to promoting Black abstract and minimalist artists. The gallery would produce shows until 1979. In 2024, the Museum of Contemporary Art Detroit mounted a tribute show, Kinship: The Legacy of Gallery 7, featuring the work of Naomi Dickerson, Lester Johnson, Allie McGhee, Charles McGee, Harold Neal, Gilda Snowden, Robert Stull, and Elizabeth Youngblood.

=== 1970s ===
As abstract art gained acceptance and more black artists experimented with abstractions, black abstract artists became new discoverers of paintings techniques. In 1970, the Museum of Fine Arts, Boston, and School of the Museum of Fine Arts mounted Afro‐American Artists: New York and Boston, a large group exhibition that included 158 works, including abstract, by 70 Black artists. Also in 1970 Melvin Edwards became the first African American sculptor to have a solo exhinltion at the Whitney Museum of American Art with the show Works.

In the Spring of 1971, the Whitney Museum unveiled Contemporary Black Artists in America. The show received a chorus of reactions, including 15 artists withdrawing from the show in solidarity with the Black Emergency Cultural Coalition and to protest the appointment of a single white curator rather than a mixed-race team of black art specialists. In response, the Black Emergency Cultural Coalition presented Rebuttal to the Whitney Museum Exhibition: Black Artists in Rebuttal, at a Greenwich Village gallery operated by Nigel Jackson, a Black painter. "Rebuttal" featured the work of 47 black artists who opposed the 1971 Whitney exhibit. A few months later, The De Luxe Show opened at the DeLux Theater in Houston, Texas' Fifth Ward, partially to respond to the exhibit controversies at museums in Houston and New York. The De Luxe Show is credited with being one of the first racially integrated art exhibitions in the United States, and more than 1,000 people attended the opening. The show organizer, Peter Bradley, selected forty abstract works by nineteen artists, including Ed Clark, Melvin Edwards, Sam Gilliam, Clement Greenberg, Virginia Jaramillo, Kenneth Noland, and others. That same year, artist and architect Hubert Taylor (1937–1991) painted an abstract mural at the SEPTA 13th St. trolley station in Philadelphia; in 1983, he co-founded Recherche, a Philadelphia-based coalition of black artists.

In 1972, Alma Thomas, a Columbus, Georgia native and the first graduate of the Howard University College of Fine Arts, became the first African-American woman to have a solo show at the Whitney Museum.

In 1973, minimalist abstract artist McArthur Binion became the first black man to receive an MFA in painting from the Cranbrook Academy of Art. Throughout his career Binion has exhibited internationally, including at the 57th Venice Biennale.

In 1975, Alvin Smith had a one-man show, Amherst Series, at Amherst College’s Mead Art Gallery. His earlier work was representational, and this exhibit announced his transition to an "organic reductivism", where he explored color pairings and relationships.

In 1976, the LACMA unveiled Two Centuries of Black American Art, a major exhibit of African-American art. The survey show covered the work of black artists during the period of 1750 to 1950, and excluded work by artists born after the 1920s. The exhibit travelled to Atlanta, Brooklyn, and Dallas, and, at the time, was the largest museum exhibition of black artists and their work.

=== 1980s ===
In 1980, MoMA PS1 presented Afro-American Abstraction: An Exhibition of Contemporary Painting and Sculpture by Nineteen Black American Artists, in Long Island City, Queens.

In 1982, the Corcoran Gallery of Art organized the travelling exhibition Black Folk Art in America, 1930–1980, a seminal show that featured the work of folk and self-taught artists, including abstract landscapes by Joseph Yoakum.

In 1985, the Washington Project for the Arts debuted Art in Washington and Its Afro-American Presence: 1940–1970, including abstract work by Ralston Crawford, Robert Gates, Sam Gilliam, Lois Jones, and Alma Thomas. That same year, David C. Driskell organized and curated, “Hidden Heritage: Afro-American Art, 1800-1950”, a major survey show of Black art for the Bellevue Art Museum and Art Museum Association of America. The touring show consisted of 84 paintings, drawings and sculptures by 42 artists and was exhibited at the Mint Museum; San Antonio Museum of Art; Toledo Museum of Art; Baltimore Museum of Art; Pennsylvania Academy of the Fine Arts; Oklahoma Museum of Art; Bronx Museum of the Arts, California Afro-American Museum; and Wadsworth Atheneum.

In 1987, the Studio Museum mounted Harlem Renaissance: Art of Black America, a traveling exhibit that toured to Crocker Art Museum, High Museum of Art, Virginia Museum of Fine Arts, and other arts institutions.

=== 1990s ===
In 1990, the Museum Overholland in Amsterdam, Netherlands, presented Black USA, the first European museum-organized exhibit of African-American art, and featured the work of Jules Allen, Benny Andrews, Romare Bearden, Robert Colescott, David Hammons, Nathaniel Hunter, and Martin Puryear.

In 1991, Kenkeleba Gallery in New York hosted The Search for Freedom: African American Abstract Painting 1945–1975, an exhibition that featured 35 Black artists who were considered to be at the "forefront of experiments and commitment to abstraction" during the middle part of the 20th century.

In 1994, The Harmon and Harriet Kelley Collection of African American Art, including abstract works, was exhibited at the San Antonio Museum of Art. The show featured 70 artists and more than 120 works of art, including Untitled (Abstraction), 1961; gouache on paper by Sam Middleton.

=== 2000s ===
In 2001, the Studio Museum in Harlem mounted Freestyle, a "Post-Black" show that featured abstract paintings by Mark Bradford, among others.

Something To Look Forward To: An Exhibition Featuring Abstract Art By 22 Distinguished Americans Of African Descent, was presented at Franklin And Marshall College in 2004, and at the Morris Museum of Art in 2008. The show featured several black abstract artists who began their careers in the late 1950s and early 1960s, which may explain why the National Endowment for the Arts rejected the curatorial team's grant proposal to fund the exhibition.

In 2006, the New York State Museum unveiled Driven to Abstraction: Works by Contemporary American Artists. The exhibit paid tribute to Black Dimensions in Art, an arts organization in the Capital area, and featured abstract artists Stephen Tyson of Clifton Park, the show's curator; Nanette Carter, Ed Clark, Gregory Coates, Herbert Gentry, Bill Hutson, Howardena Pindell, George Simmons of Albany, Frank Wimberley, and others. In Spring 2006, the Studio Museum in Harlem presented a blockbuster exhibition, Energy/Experimentation: Black Artists and Abstraction 1964–1980, featuring the work of fifteen significant black abstract artists. As part of the exhibit, the Studio Museum hosted a round-table discussion and related events where artists, gallerists, and museum leaders delved into topics that shaped black abstraction, including the Black Arts Movement, jazz, and racial politics.

In 2007, Michael Rosenfeld Gallery presented Decoding Myth: African American Abstraction, 1945–1975, featuring the work of Charles Alston, Harold Cousins, Beauford Delaney, Sam Gilliam, Norman Lewis, Alma Thomas, and Hale Woodruff.

=== 2010s ===
In 2010, the Wilmer Jennings Gallery at Kenkeleba House in New York organized African American Abstract Masters that was presented at the Anita Shapolsky Art Foundation in Jim Thorpe, Pennsylvania, and the Opalka Gallery at the Sage Colleges in Albany, New York. African American Abstract Masters featured the work of Betty Blayton, Frank Bowling, Ed Clark, Herbert Gentry, Bill Hutson, Sam Middleton, Joe Overstreet, Thomas Sills, Merton Simpson. and Frank Wimberley.

In 2012, the Smithsonian American Art Museum presented African American Art: Harlem Renaissance, Civil Rights Era, and Beyond, an exhibition that showcased paintings, sculpture, prints, and photographs by forty-three Black artists, including abstract work by Thornton Dial, Felrath Hines, Kenneth Victor Young, and others. After its Washington, DC, opening, the exhibit traveled to Muscarelle Museum of Art (Williamsburg, VA), Mennello Museum of American Art (Orlando, FL), Peabody Essex Museum (Salem, MA), The Albuquerque Museum of Art and History (Albuquerque, NM), Hunter Museum of American Art (Chattanooga, TN), and the Crocker Art Museum (Sacramento, CA). That same year, the Hammer Museum opened Now Dig This!: Art and Black Los Angeles 1960–1980. The exhibit featured 140 works from 35 artists and honored the Black artists who started their careers in LA, such as Melvin Edwards, David Hammons, Maren Hassinger, Senga Nengudi, John Outterbridge, Noah Purifoy, and Betye Saar, and their significant contributions to American art history. After its Los Angeles opening, the exhibit traveled to MoMA PS1 in 2012, and Williams College Museum of Art in 2013.

In 2014, Michael Rosenfeld Gallery in New York hosted a painting and sculpture show that featured the work of Black abstract artists and their work in the years just before, during, and after the Civil Rights Movement.

In 2015, the Philadelphia Museum of Art presented Represent: 200 Years of African American Art, and showcased a range of subjects and styles, including abstract paintings and sculpture from the 1960s through the 1980s. That same year, the California African American Museum mounted Hard Edged: Geometrical Abstraction and Beyond.

In 2016, the Newark Museum opened a seven-month long exhibition, Modern Heroics: 75 Years of African-American Expressionism at Newark Museum. The exhibit featured works by self-taught artists, works from the museum's permanent collection that were displayed for the first time, and a wide range of abstract art, including folk and outsider art. That same year, Pace Gallery hosted Blackness in Abstraction, featuring the work of 29 Black and white abstract artists from different generations.

In 2017, the Harvey B. Gantt Center for African-American Arts + Culture unveiled The Future is Abstract, highlighting the abstract paintings and mixed-media work of four Black artists and testifying to the importance of abstraction and Black Abstractionism. The Ogden Museum of Southern Art presented the traveling abstract art show Solidary and Solitary, featuring 70 works from the Pamela J. Joyner and Alfred J. Giuffrida (Joyner/Giuffrida) Collection. The exhibit travelled to the Nasher Museum in 2020.

In 2018, the Baltimore Museum of Art celebrated the nearly 80th anniversary of its landmark exhibition Contemporary Negro Art, with a new show that included 14 prints and drawings by African-American artists who were featured in the 1939 exhibit. The following year, the museum would open Generations: A History of Black Abstract Art, a sweeping perspective of Black Abstractionism including significant work from the Joyner/Giuffrida Collection. In addition, the Hunter College Art Galleries hosted Acts of Art and Rebuttal in 1971, a 2018 revisiting of the 1971 Rebuttal to the Whitney Museum Exhibition: Black Artists in Rebuttal, a show that explored abstraction, expressionism, satire, and symbolism. Additionally, the National Museum of Women in the Arts presented Magnetic Fields: Expanding American Abstraction, 1960s to Today, an exhibit organized by the Kemper Museum of Contemporary Art in 2018. The show featured different generations of Black women artists; the twenty-one artists were born between 1891 and 1981. Magnetic Fields artists include Candida Alvarez, Betty Blayton, Chakaia Booker, Lilian Thomas Burwell, Nanette Carter, Barbara Chase-Riboud, Deborah Dancy, Abigail DeVille, Maren Hassinger, Jennie C. Jones, Evangeline Montgomery, Howardena Pindell, Mavis Pusey, Shinique Smith, Gilda Snowden, Kianja Strobert, and Brenna Youngblood; and four alumna of the Howard University art department: Alma Woodsey Thomas, Mildred Thompson, Mary Lovelace O'Neal, and Sylvia Snowden.

=== 2020 to present ===
The Saint Louis Art Museum presented The Shape of Abstraction: Selections from the Ollie Collection. The Thelma and Bert Ollie Memorial Collection was gifted to the museum by Monique McRipley Ollie and Ronald Maurice Ollie, who named the collection of black abstract work to honor his parents. The collection includes 81 works by 33 artists, including Robert Blackburn, Chakaia Booker, Frank Bowling, Nanette Carter, Ed Clark, Herbert Gentry, Sam Gilliam, Norman Lewis, James Little, Al Loving, Evangeline Montgomery, Mary Lovelace O’Neal, and Stanley Whitney. The Trio Foundation of St. Louis sponsored The Shape of Abstraction and related activities.

In 2022, the National Gallery of Art presented, Called to Create: Black Artists of the American South, an exhibit of assemblage, drawings, paintings, quilts, and other items from the Souls Grown Deep Foundation that included abstract work by Mary Lee Bendolph, Thornton Dial, Mary T. Smith, and Purvis Young, among others. The Green Family Foundation in Dallas, Texas, presented Black Abstractionists: From Then 'til Now, a show of 38 established and emerging Black abstract artists. Two weeks later, Hampton University Museum presented the Whoosah exhibit to showcase the contributions of six black artists creating works in different forms of Black Abstractionism. The featured artists included Lillian T. Burwell, Sam Gilliam, Howardena Pindell, Junius Redwood, Frank Smith, and Hubert C. Taylor. The exhibited works were from the museum's permanent collection.

In 2023, the Crocker Art Museum launched Black Artists in America: From Civil Rights to the Bicentennial, featuring abstract and figurative works by 48 artists, including Romare Bearden, Sam Gilliam, Betye Saar, Alma Thomas, Charles White, and Samella Lewis, whose grandson curated the Crocker's previous effort, Black Artists on Art: Past, Present, and Future, in 2022. This exhibit was organized by the Dixon Gallery and Gardens (Memphis, Tennessee), and confirmed that during the latter part of the 20th century that there was not a singular ideology or an "all-Black" style.

In 2024, several museum shows featured Black abstract artists and examples of black abstractionism. The Montclair Museum exhibited Century: 100 Years of Black Art at MAM, the largest show in the museum's history, and highlighted abstract work by Emma Amos, Chakaia Booker, Nanette Carter, Joyce J. Scott, and others. The Ogden Museum of Southern Art in New Orleans hosted Southern Abstraction: Works from the Permanent Collection, including pieces by artists of all colors, including Black artists Beauford Delaney, Clementine Hunter, John T. Scott, Merton Simpson, and others. The Phillips Collection presented the African Modernism in America, 1947-67 exhibition that explored the relationship between African artists and their relationship to Black artists, cultural organizations, and audiences in America. In 1967, Fisk University received a gift of modern African Art, from the Harmon Foundation. Among the Black artists to have their abstract work featured in the exhibit were Skunder Boghossian, who was born in Africa and lived in the United States, and David Driskell. In 2025 The Metropolitan Museum of Art unveiled Flight into Egypt: Black Artists and Ancient Egypt, 1876–Now, an examination of how Black artists and others use their work to interpret ancient Egypt. The show featured several abstract objects, including works by Ayé Aton, Jean-Michel Basquiat, Robert Colescott, Jeff Donaldson, Aaron Douglas, Sam Gilliam, David Hammons, Eric N. Mack, Julie Mehretu, and William T. Williams, among others.

== Related collectives, movements, schools, and trends ==
- African Modernism in America
- AfriCOBRA (African Coalition of Black Revolutionary Artists)
- Art Workers’ Coalition
- Black Artists Group
- Black Artists in the Museum
- Black Arts Movement
- Black Emergency Cultural Coalition
- Black primitivism
- Committee for the Negro in the Arts (1947–1954)
- Federal Art Project
- Harlem Artists Guild
- Hurufiyya movement
- Irascibles
- Organization of Black American Culture
- Post-black art
- Spiral Group
- Washington Color School
- Weusi Artist Collective
- Where We At

== Artists ==
The following list represents significant black artists who produced abstract work at some point in their careers. Many artists reject being labeled or categorized and express their creative development by moving to and from different mediums. These artists and many of their works would be considered contributions to the Black Abstractionism canon.

- Charles Alston
- Candida Alvarez
- Emma Amos
- Ellsworth Augustus Ausby
- Rushern Baker IV
- Ranti Bam
- Jean-Michel Basquiat
- Romare Bearden
- Kevin Beasley
- John T. Biggers
- McArthur Binion
- Robert Blackburn
- Betty Blayton-Taylor
- Lula Mae Blocton
- Skunder Boghossian
- Chakaia Booker
- Frank Bowling
- Mark Bradford
- Peter Bradley
- Moe Brooker
- Samuel Joseph Brown
- Vivian E. Browne
- Beverly Buchanan
- Lilian T. Burwell
- Yvonne Pickering Carter
- Barbara Chase-Riboud
- Ed Clark (artist)
- Robert Colescott
- Bethany Collins
- Houston Conwill
- Eldzier Cortor
- Adger Cowans
- Ralston Crawford
- Emilio Cruz
- Deborah Dancy
- Richard W. Dempsey
- Thornton Dial
- Leonardo Drew
- David Driskell
- Torkwase Dyson
- Minnie Evans
- Fred Eversley
- Jadé Fadojutimi
- Charles Gaines
- Theaster Gates
- Herbert Gentry
- Ficre Ghebreyesus
- Lauren Halsey
- David Hammons
- Maren Hassinger
- Barkley L. Hendricks
- Felrath Hines
- Richard Hunt
- Bill Hutson
- Tomashi Jackson
- Virginia Jaramillo
- Wadsworth Jarrell
- Daniel LaRue Johnson
- Malvin Gray Johnson
- Rashid Johnson
- Sargent Claude Johnson
- Jennie C. Jones
- Rachel Jones
- Samuel Levi Jones
- Ronald Joseph
- Titus Kaphar
- Wifredo Lam
- Doyle Lane
- Claude Lawrence
- Norman Lewis
- Glenn Ligon
- James Little
- Tom Lloyd
- Al Loving
- Rick Lowe
- Eric N. Mack
- Eugene J. Martin
- Richard Mayhew
- Hugo McCloud
- Charles McGee
- Allie McGhee
- Julie Mehretu
- Sam Middleton
- E. J. Montgomery
- Jayson Musson
- Senga Nengudi
- Odili Donald Odita
- Lorraine O’Grady
- Mary Lovelace O'Neal
- Joe Overstreet
- Adam Pendleton
- Howardena Pindell
- Adrian Piper
- Rose Piper
- William Pope.L
- Martin Puryear
- Rammellzee
- Helen Evans Ramsaran
- Robin Rhode
- John Rhoden
- Haywood Bill Rivers
- Nellie Mae Rowe
- Allison Saar
- Raymond Saunders
- John T. Scott
- Charles Searles
- Ferrari Sheppard
- Yinka Shonibare
- Thomas Sills
- Gary Simmons
- Lorna Simpson
- Merton Simpson
- Shinique Smith
- Gilda Snowden
- Sylvia Snowden
- Vaughn Spann
- Tavares Strachan
- Thelma Johnson Streat
- Alma Thomas
- Mickalene Thomas
- Bob Thompson
- Mildred Thompson
- Leo Twiggs
- Kara Walker
- Carrie Mae Weems
- Charles White
- Stanley Whitney
- Jack Whitten
- William T. Williams
- Fred Wilson
- Frank Wimberley
- Hale Woodruff
- Lynette Yiadom-Boakye
- Joseph Yoakum
- Kenneth Victor Young
- Brenna Youngblood

=== Other artists ===
- Patrick Alston
- Larry Compton Callow
- Harold Cousins
- Zimeri A. Cox
- Mary Reed Daniel
- DeShawn Dumas
- Ray Grist
- Zell Ingram
- Gerald Jackson
- Harlan Jackson
- Jamillah Jennings
- D.E. Johnson
- Delvin B. Johnson
- Spencer Russell Lewis
- Donovan Mclean
- Algernon Miller
- Gabriel Mills
- Tyrone Mitchell
- Oscar Murillo
- Serge Alain Nitegeka
- James Phillips
- Naudline Pierre
- Junius Redwood
- Samuel Ross
- Tariku Shiferaw
- Alvin Smith
- Frank Smith
- Reginald Sylvester II
- Hubert C. Taylor
- Shoshanna Weinberger
- Dmitri Wright
- Michaela Yearwood-Dan

== See also ==
- Abstraction
- Abstract expressionism
- Action painting
- American Abstract Artists
- List of African-American visual artists
