= Nanette Carter =

African-American artist and college educator

- Born: Nanette Carolyn Carter; 1954; Columbus, OH, U.S.
- Education: Bachelor of Arts, Oberlin College; Master of Fine Arts, Pratt Institute; Accademia di Belle Arti, Perugia, Italy
- Known for: Abstract Art
- Notable work: Afro Sentinels II; Cantilevered

Nanette Carolyn Carter, born January 30, 1954, in Columbus, Ohio, is an African-American artist and college educator living and working in New York City, best known for her collages with paper, canvas and Mylar (archival plastic sheets).

Daughter of Frances Hill Carter (January 13, 1920 – February 2, 2015) and Matthew G. Carter (October 16, 1913 – March 14, 2012), Nanette and her sister, Bettye Carter Freeman, grew up in Montclair, New Jersey, and graduated from Montclair High School. Her father served as the city's first African American Mayor (1968-1972), and her mother was an elementary school teacher who also taught dance, later becoming a reading specialist and Vice Principal in the Paterson Public Schools.

== Early life ==
In 1960, Carter's family moved from Ohio to Montclair, New Jersey. A doctor of divinity, her father was also a civil rights leader dedicated to social justice and housing reforms and served as Chair of the New Jersey Commission on Civil Rights.

Carter earned a BA from Oberlin College in 1976, majoring in Studio Art and Art History. During her junior year at Oberlin, she lived and studied at the Accademia di Belle Arti in Perugia, Italy. After graduating, Carter enrolled in Pratt Institute, Brooklyn, NY, where she earned her Master of Fine Arts in 1978.

== Career ==
In 1978, Care began teaching printmaking and drawing at the Dwight-Englewood School, Englewood, New Jersey, while she continued to develop her career as a full-time practicing artist.

Since 1981, Carter's professional career in the arts has included extensive lecturing and teaching, conducting workshops, and serving as a panelist and juror for many universities and art institutions. Recent invitations include Bard College, NY (lecture), Museo Nacional de Bellas Artes, Havana, Cuba (lecture), University of Hawaii, Hilo, Hawaii (lecture), Wayne State University, MI (lecture), Concordia College, NY (lecture)

Since 2001, Carter has taught drawing at Pratt Institute, Brooklyn, NY, where she is a tenured Adjunct Associate Professor.

Carter's work has been shown in numerous solo and group exhibitions and is represented in over 45 corporate collections in addition to museum, library and university collections, including: The National Museum of Fine Arts, Havana, Cuba, The Studio Museum, New York, NY, Yale University Art Gallery, New Haven, CT, The Pennsylvania Academy of the Fine Arts, Philadelphia, PA, The Brandywine Workshop and Archives, Philadelphia, Museum of Art, Rhode Island School of Design, Providence, RI, among others.

== Creative practice ==
In a 1984 Cooper-Hewitt Museum of Decorative Arts and Design exhibition, “Frank Lloyd Wright and the Prairie School,” Carter first saw Mylar in use by many of Wright's students. Known today for her collages with paper, canvas and Mylar (archival plastic sheets), Carter's work is recognized for its complex compositions, paintings, and drawings

Her work directly responds to contemporary issues around war, injustices, and technology. She seeks to address the need for “negotiating the realities of inequality seen around the world” as evident in her series “Afro-Sentinels II" that emanates from the desire to combat racial injustice with a cadre of vigilant guards. A body of recent work, begun in 2013, “Cantilevered” becomes a metaphor for 21st Century life, “living with technology advancing every day, forcing one to look at global issues....responsibilities....a deluge of information and history.” In her creative practice for many years, Carter has been dedicated to working with intangible ideas around contemporary issues in an abstract vocabulary of form, line, and color, and to present the mysteries of nature and human nature. She seeks to achieve at the same time luminosity, transparency, and density in her compositions.

== Permanent collections (selection) ==
Nanette Carter's work is included in the permanent collections of museums in the United States and abroad.

- Pérez Art Museum Miami, Florida
- Columbus Museum of Art, Ohio
- Museo Nacional de Bellas Artes de La Habana, Cuba
- Pennsylvania Academy of Arts, Philadelphia
- Saint Louis Art Museum, Missouri
- Studio Museum in Harlem, New York
- Yale University Art Gallery, Connecticut

== Awards and honors ==
Carter has been awarded honors including the Anonymous Was A Woman Award (2021), The Adolph and Esther Gottlieb Foundation Grant, NY (2014), Artists’ Fellowship Inc. Grant, NY (2013), The Mayer Foundation Grant, NY (2013), Cultural Envoy to Syria, (2007) chosen by the US State Department to represent US at the 7th Annual Women's Art Festival in Aleppo, Syria, Mudd Library, Oberlin College (2003) Commission, OH, and invitations to be a resident artist at Hydra Art Project (2017), Perugia, Italy and the Experimental Printmaking Institute (2015), Lafayette College, PA.
