= Brenna Youngblood =

American artist

- Born: 1979 (age 46–47); Riverside, California
- Education: California State University, Long Beach (B.F.A.); University of California, Los Angeles (M.F.A.)
- Known for: Photographic collage, sculpture, and painting

Brenna Youngblood (born 1979) is an American artist based in Los Angeles who is known for creating photographic collages, sculpture, and paintings. Her work explores issues of African-American identity and representation.

== Education ==
Youngblood received a BFA from the California State University, Long Beach in 2002 where Todd Gray became her mentor and an MFA from the University of California, Los Angeles in 2006 where she studied under Catherine Opie, James Welling and Larry Pittman.

== Work ==
Youngblood's work often references historically significant moments and organizations in African-American history such as her 2017 sculpture M.I.A. which "refers to the Montgomery Improvement Association, a group co-organized by Martin Luther King, Jr. to guide the Montgomery bus boycott protest in 1955".

Youngblood has held 21 solo exhibitions from 2006 to 2021. Youngblood's first solo exhibition was presented at the Hammer Museum, Hammer Projects: Brenna Youngblood (2006) while attending UCLA's Graduate Program in Art. Following this exhibition, she was included in solo exhibitions at Margo Leavin [Gallery] (2007 & 2008), Susanne Vielmetter (2006 & 2008) and Tilton Gallery (2014 & 2017) with prominent art dealer Jack Tilton. Exhibitions with Scottish art dealer Honor Fraser at Honor Fraser Gallery were held in (2011, 2013 & 2016). Exhibitions were presented in Paris and Brussels with esteemed French art dealer Nathalie Obadia at Galerie Nathalie Obadia (2013, 2015 & 2017). She has also been a part of 96 group exhibitions from 2004 to 2023. Many of Youngblood's exhibitions have been shown largely in Los Angeles and New York City. She is represented by Roberts Projects, Tilton Gallery and Galerie Nathalie Obadia. Her work is included in the collections of the Seattle Art Museum, Los Angeles Museum of Art, the Museum of Contemporary Art, Hammer Museum, The Studio Museum of Harlem, Fundación/Colección Jumex, Pomona College Museum of Art, Mead Art Museum at Amherst College, JP Morgan Chase Art Collection, Kadist Foundation, Eileen Harris Norton, Creative Artists Agency, The Blake Byrne Collection, Art, Design, and Architecture Museum at UC Santa Barbara. She was included in the 2019 traveling exhibition Young, Gifted, and Black: The Lumpkin-Boccuzzi Family Collection of Contemporary Art.

As a prolific artist Youngblood's one-person exhibitions of her work have been presented at the Seattle Art Museum, Seattle, WA (2015); Pomona College Museum of Art, Claremont, CA (2015); Contemporary Art Museum, St. Louis, MO (2014); Wignall Museum, Rancho Cucamonga, CA (2007); and the Hammer Museum, Los Angeles, CA (2006). Her work has been included in thematic exhibitions such as Sonic Rebellion: Music as Resistance, Museum of Contemporary Art Detroit, Detroit, MI (2017); Face to Face: Los Angeles Collects Portraiture, California African American Museum, Los Angeles, CA (2017); The Future is Abstract, Harvey B. Gantt Center for African American Arts + Culture, Charlotte, NC (2017); L.A. Exuberance: New Gifts by Artists, Los Angeles County Museum of Art, Los Angeles, CA (2016); AFRICA FORECAST: Fashioning Contemporary Life, Spelman College Museum of Fine Art, Atlanta, GA (2016); A Shape That Stands Up, Art + Practice, Los Angeles, CA (2016); Wasteland, Los Angeles Nomadic Division, Paris, France (2016); Hard Edged, California African American Museum, Los Angeles (2015); Selections from the Permanent Collection, Museum of Contemporary Art, Los Angeles (2014); Rites of Spring, Contemporary Arts Museum, Houston, TX (2014); Murmurs: Recent Contemporary Acquisitions, Los Angeles County Museum of Art, Los Angeles (2013); Fore, The Studio Museum in Harlem, New York, NY (2012); Made in L.A., Hammer Museum, Los Angeles (2012); Unfinished Paintings, Los Angeles Contemporary Exhibitions, Los Angeles (2011); With You I Want to Live, Fort Lauderdale Museum of Art, Fort Lauderdale, FL (2009); California Biennial, Orange County Museum of Art, Newport Beach, CA (2008); and Blacks In and Out of the Box, California African American Museum, Los Angeles, CA (2007).

== Awards ==
- 2015 Seattle Art Museum Gwendolyn Knight/Jacob Lawrence Prize
- 2014 The Hermitage Artist Retreat, Englewood, FL
- 2012 Los Angeles County Museum of Art Young Talent Award/AHAN Award.
