= Deborah Dancy =

African-American artist (born 1949)

- Born: 1949 (age 76–77); Bessemer, Alabama
- Education: Illinois Wesleyan University, Bloomington, Ill. - BFA (1973); Illinois State University, Normal, Ill. - MS in Printmaking (1976), MFA in Painting (1979)
- Known for: Painting, drawing, printmaking, photography, artist's books
- Movement: Contemporary art, abstract art
- Awards: 1985 - YADDO Fellowship; 1997 - John Simon Guggenheim Foundation Fellowship

Deborah Dancy, also known as Deborah Muirhead (born 1949), is an American painter of large-scale abstractions in oil; she is also a printmaker and mixed media artist. Her work is also known to encompass digital photography. In 1981, she began to teach at the University of Connecticut, Storrs, where she taught painting for thirty-five years until her retirement in 2017. She has received awards such as a John Simon Guggenheim Foundation Fellowship, Women's Studio Workshop Studio Residency Grant, and a YADDO fellowship.

== Early life and education ==
Dancy was born in 1949 in Bessemer, Alabama. She was born into an African-American family who treasured their heritage and ancestry. Dancy received her BFA degree from Illinois Wesleyan University in 1973, as well as an MS in printmaking and MFA in painting from Illinois State University, in 1976 and 1979, respectively.

== Career ==
Her painting "Seed Travel" appeared in the Stamford Museum and Nature Center. Dancy taught painting at the University of Connecticut, Storrs for thirty-five years, before retiring in 2017.

Dancy’s works are in the permanent collections of numerous galleries and academic institutions, some of which include the Museum of Fine Arts Boston, the Birmingham Museum of Art in Alabama, and the Baltimore Museum of Art. Dancy was also nominated for a Connecticut Children's Book Award for Illustration for The Freedom Business as an illustrator and co-author.

Dancy was the art director and the illustrator of The Freedom Business, a book by her friend Marilyn Nelson.

== Public collections ==
- Allen Memorial Art Museum, Oberlin College, Oberlin, Ohio
- Baltimore Museum of Art
- Birmingham Museum of Art, Birmingham, Ala.
- Cedar Rapids Museum of Art, Cedar Rapids, Iowa
- Columbia Museum of Art, Columbia, S.C.
- Davison Art Center, Wesleyan University, Middletown, Conn.
- Detroit Institute of Arts
- Figge Art Museum, Davenport, Iowa
- Fine Art Museum, Bardo Arts Center, Western Carolina University, Cullowhee, N.C.
- Fine Arts Museum, Vanderbilt University, Nashville, Tenn.
- Grinnell College, Grinnell, Iowa
- Hunter Museum of American Art, Chattanooga, Tenn.
- Kemper Museum of Contemporary Art, Kansas City, Mo.
- Mead Art Museum, Amherst College, Amherst, Mass.
- Montgomery Museum of Fine Arts, Montgomery, Ala.
- Museum of Fine Arts, Boston
- Samek Art Gallery, Bucknell University, Lewisburg, Penn.
- Raclin Murphy Museum of Art, University of Notre Dame, Notre Dame, Ind.
- Spencer Museum of Art, University of Kansas, Lawrence, Kans.
- United States Embassy, Yaoundé, Cameroon

== Awards and honors ==
- Women's Studio Workshop Studio Residency Grant
- Banff Creative Residency Program Grant
- University of Connecticut School of Fine Arts Outstanding Faculty Award
- The University of Connecticut Chancellor’s Research Fellowship
- American Antiquarian Society William Randolph Hearst Artist and Writers Creative Arts Fellowship
- Nexus Press Artist Book Project Residency Award
- Visual Studies Press Artist in Residency Award
- Louis Comfort Tiffany Foundation Nominee
- John Simon Guggenheim Foundation Fellowship
- New England Foundation for the Arts Regional National Endowment for the Arts, Individual Artist Grant
- Joan Mitchell Foundation Nominee
- Juror's Merit Award, New American Talent: Laguna Gloria Museum
- Connecticut Commission on the Arts Individual Artist Grant
- Yale University Visiting Faculty Fellow
- YADDO Fellowship
- Connecticut Book Award Illustration Nominee - "The Freedom Business"

== Bibliography ==
- Armstrong, Kathleen, et al. "Children's Literature Reviews: 2008 Poetry Notables". Language Arts, vol. 86, no. 6, 2009, pp. 468–472. JSTOR
- "Book Design, Digital Imaging and Photography". Clarellen, Clarellen and Cary Graphic Arts Press, New York, 2001
- Danza, Emmie. "Deborah Dancy, Chasing the Light". Gallery Artist Deborah Dancy Reviewed on The Drawing Center Column, "Annotations", The Drawing Center, June 27, 2013
- Edwards, Jeff. “‘It’s a Constant Struggle to Keep the 'Thingness' at Bay’: An Interview with Deborah Dancy". Artpulse, 2015
- "Front Matter". African American Review, vol. 41, no. 3, 2007
- "Flatfile Collection, Queen Bea". Artspace New Haven. 2016
- King, Leslie. "Gumbo Ya Ya : Anthology of Contemporary African-American Women Artists". HathiTrust Digital Library, Midmarch Arts Press, 1995
- McNALLY, OWEN. “Painter Muirhead peers through a history, darkly". Courant.com, Hartford Courant, September 13, 2018
- Mercer, Valerie J., et al. "Examining Identities". Bulletin of the Detroit Institute of Arts, vol. 86, no. 1/4, 2012, pp. 66–87. JSTOR, www.jstor.org/stable/43492326.
- Mobilio, Albert. "The Bookness of Not-Books: Modern and Contemporary Artists' Books", The Paris Review, June 22, 2017
- Nelson, Marilyn. "The Freedom Business (Ca. 1790)". Venture Smith and the Business of Slavery and Freedom, edited by James Brewer Stewart. by James O. Horton, University of Massachusetts Press, 2010, pp. 257–258. JSTOR, www.jstor.org/stable/j.ctt5vk4gq.16.
- Perosino, Bruno. "Marking 35 Years: The Work of Deborah Dancy". The William Benton Museum of Art, July 18, 2017
- Raynor, Vivian. "Spirit in the Wood/Paint". The New York Times, Sunday, February 26, 1989
- Raynor, Vivian, "Stamford Museum". The New York Times, Sunday: May 2, 1989
- Robert, Kiener. "In Works with a Visceral, Spontaneous Feel, Deborah Dancy Explores the Amorphous Zone between Abstraction and Representation". New England Home Magazine
- Robin Kahn. ROBIN KAHN, January 1, 1970.
- Rosoff, Patricia. “Small Vistas, The 10-Year Show at 100 Pearl". Hartford Advocate, July 15, 2004.
- Zimmer, William. "ART; A Glimpse of Contemporary Taste". The New York Times, February 25, 1996.
- Zimmer, William. "Connecticut Biennial". The New York Times, April 14, 1991.
