= McArthur Binion =

American artist

- Born: September 1, 1946 (age 80); Macon, Mississippi, U.S.
- Education: Wayne State University; Cranbrook Academy of Art

McArthur Binion (born 1946) is an American artist based in Chicago, Illinois. Binion was born in Macon, Mississippi. He holds a BFA from Wayne State University (1971) in Detroit, Michigan, and an MFA from Cranbrook Academy of Art in Bloomfield Hills, Michigan. He was a Professor of Art at Columbia College in Chicago from 1993 to 2015.

== Early life ==
Binion was born on September 1, 1946, on a cotton farm in Macon, Mississippi, to Russell Earl Binion and Martha Binion in a family of 11 children. Since childhood, Binion has spoken with a stutter.

In 1951, his family moved to Detroit so that his father could work in the auto industry. He attended Mumford High School and graduated in 1964.

== Career ==
After high school, Binion majored in business administration at Morgan State University, before transferring to Wayne State University to become a creative writing major. When he was 19, Binion dropped out from Wayne State to become an associate editor of a magazine in Harlem called Haryou-Act. While in that role, Binion was exposed to the Museum of Modern Art's collection of Abstract Expressionist paintings, including those by Jasper Johns and Wifredo Lam. Two years later, Binion took his first drawing class while traveling in Europe.

Binion received his BFA from Wayne State in 1971, and his MFA from the Cranbrook Academy of Art in 1973. Upon his graduation from Cranbrook, Binion became the first Black student to earn an MFA in painting from the school.

In 1973, he moved back to New York, where Binion worked amidst and befriended many other artists of the era working in the city, such as Jean Michel-Basquiat, Sol Lewitt, Martin Puryear and Judy Pfaff. The same year he moved to New York, Binion was selected for a group show at Artists Space, the non-profit organization's second exhibition co-curated by Lewitt and Carl Andre. Binion's paintings have since appeared in the Contemporary Arts Museum Houston, the Studio Museum in New York, and the Detroit Institute of Art.

In 1991, Binion moved to Chicago, where he took a position as Professor of Art at Columbia College in 1993. Though he worked continuously during that period, he exhibited his work infrequently until Chicago dealer Kavi Gupta began representing him in 2013. Binion was represented by Kavi Gupta and Galerie Lelong & Co. until he joined Lehmann Maupin and Massimo De Carlo galleries in 2018. In 2017, Binion was included the Christine Macel's curated VIVA ARTE VIVA for the 57th Venice Biennale, where his paintings from his DNA series received notable mention.

A 2019 front page article in The New York Times recognized him, and others, as among a "generation of African-American artists in their 70s and 80s who are enjoying a market renaissance after decades of indifference."

== Work ==
dna:study (2020) at the Art Institute of Chicago, in 2023

McArthur Binion's work primarily consists of minimalist abstract paintings, created using crayons, oil stick, and ink, often on rigid surfaces such as wood or aluminum. For many years, Binion has been incorporating laser-prints as a collaged ground on top of which he applies other mediums. Binion says that what he takes away from minimalism in his creative process is “that you want to do your own stuff in your own image.” His work has been compared to Dorothea Rockburne, Robert Mangold, Robert Ryman and Jasper Johns’s “The Dutch Wives” paintings at times.

Binion identifies as a "Rural Modernist," and says that his work "begins at the crossroads—at the intersection of Bebop improvisation and Abstract Expressionism.” His work is influenced by modernist artists such as Kasimir Severinovich Malevich, Piet Mondrian, and Wifredo Lam.

In his most recent exhibition (the DNA Study series), Binion's paintings aren’t fully abstract, but attempt to talk about the black experience and his personal history at the same time. Acting as a kind of template for gridded marks in black, white and occasionally brightly colored oil-paint-stick layered on top, are pages from Binion's 1970's handwritten phone books, passport ID and negatives of his birth certificate.

In 2019, Binion started the Modern Ancient Brown foundation in Detroit, which awards fellowships and hosts a residency program for artists and writers of color.

== Personal life ==
Binion was in a relationship with playwright Ntozake Shange from 1978 to 1980; their daughter, Savannah Shange-Binion, is a professor of anthropology at the University of California, Santa Cruz, and is the goddaughter of jazz musician Cecil Taylor. Binion was later married to Carla Jean Mayer, with whom he shares two children; the couple has since divorced.

== Selected exhibitions ==
- 2025: Rawness Dancing:With Intellect, Xavier Hufkens, Brussels, Belgium
- 2019: Ghost: Rhythms & Haints, Mississippi Museum of Art, Jackson, MS
- 2018: Binion/Saarinen: The McArthur Binion Project, Cranbrook Art Museum, Bloomfield Hills, MI
- 2017: VIVA ARTE VIVA, 57th Venice Biennale
- 2012: Perspectives 177: McArthur Binion, Contemporary Arts Museum Houston, Houston, TX
