= Marion Perkins =

American sculptor

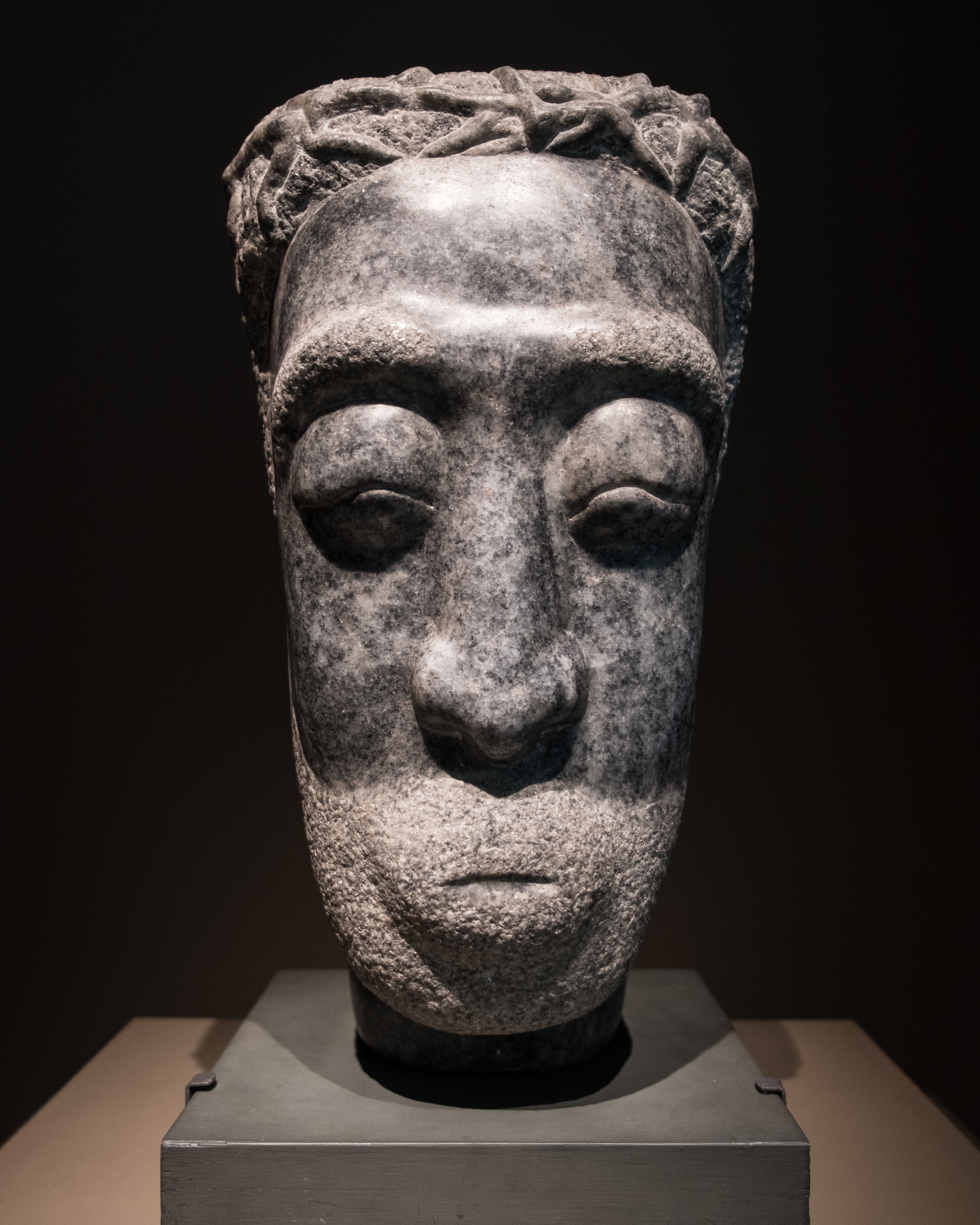
Marion Perkins, Man of Sorrows, 1950. Art Institute of Chicago.

Marion Marche Perkins (1908 – December 17, 1961) was an American sculptor who taught and exhibited at Chicago's South Side Community Art Center and exhibited at the Art Institute of Chicago. Perkins is widely considered an important artist of the Chicago Renaissance.

== Early life ==
Marion Perkins was born in Arkansas in 1908 and he lived there with his grandparents. He relocated to Chicago at the age of 8. Perkins attended Wendell Phillips Elementary and High School, but did not graduate. He was, however, raised by his aunt after the sudden death of both of his parents. His education is best understood to be self-taught. He had only received basic instruction by Simon Gordon from a local YMCA. Simon Gordon also became a well-known figure in the world of sculpting.

== Personal life ==
During the Depression, Perkins settled down with Eva Gillion – his new wife – and bought a house in the South Side, known then as Bronzeville. He and Eva made great efforts to network and meet the great intellectuals and authors Chicago had to offer. He then had three sons, Robert, Toussaint, and Eugene, with his wife Eva. After his untimely death, his wife soon perished, but the family made an account of his life as well as set up a foundation.

== Philosophy, ideology, and beliefs ==
Marion became known as an avid outspoken believer in social equality, inclusion, and black expression. His voice as an artist from the South Side resonated with many young black Americans. Perkins said at many occasions that he wanted to inspire young, African-American boys who were put down by society. He sought to improve the image of the impoverished and racially segregated slums in Chicago's South Side.

He also writes about disparities and often discusses what he believes would be a better system: communism. He joined an artistic "awakened" communist group in Chicago. Around 1948, he started work on several sculptures titled "Skywatchers" in response to the bombing of Hiroshima in 1945.

Later in his life, he became known as a firm Marxist who detested the classist actions taken in art and was known to have spoken badly about other artists of the time who focused on art to please wealthy buyers. As he grew older, many knew him to converse and engage socially with many known Marxists; many speculated that he followed the movement because of his struggles with poverty in his early life. He was a critic of the abstract movement and wanted to represent the world with a socially political understanding of the time.

== Major works ==
- “Mask of Eva” (circa 1935)
- “John Henry” (1942)
- “Portrait of Eva” (circa 1947)
- “Figure at Rest” (circa 1947)
- “Seated Figure” (1947)
- “Dying Soldier” (1952)
- “Unknown Political Prisoner” (1953)
- “Sancho Panza and Don Quixote” (circa 1955)
- “Skywatchers” series (1948-1955)
- "Man of Sorrows" (1950)
- "Portrait of Eva" (c. 1947)
- "Standing Figure" (late 1940s)
- "Nude Model Reclining" (n.d.)
- "Father and Child" (n.d.)
- "Strathmore" (c. 1945–1950)
- "Talent ART Tablet" (n.d.)

== Career ==
Perkins purchased a newspaper stand in 1936 and started carving from discarded materials during the work day. Peter Pollack of the Works Progress Administration's Illinois Art Project and Southside Community Art Center noticed Perkins' work after passing the newsstand and soon introduced him to Simon Gordon, a sculptor who assisted Perkins with his formal training. He recognized his talents and wanted to help him. This is where Perkins met Simon Gordon who was a major figure in launching his career. He then received commission, through the help of Gordon, from the Baltimore Hotel in South Haven, Michigan. He was to create 6 large statues of children in Dutch Attire. He won many more awards but failed to ever reach national recognition. One of Perkins biggest clients was the IBM corporation in 1947. Perkins received a $2,400 scholarship immediately after losing his job with the USPS for not taking the necessary "loyalty oath," recently installed by Truman. He then went on to create his most famous piece ever, "Man of Sorrows" which won first prize in the university's “Chicago and Vicinity” series as well as the prestigious Pauline Palmer Purchase Prize. He began to teach, and eventually became a fixture at the South Side Community Art Center and the Hull House. Also around this time, the famous poet of the Harlem Renaissance, Langston Hughes, praised Perkins. Posthumously, his family continued his legacy and set up a foundation in his name. Perkins taught sculpture at the Southside Community Art Center and Jackson State University.

He continued to work and exhibit until his death in 1961.
