= Tomashi Jackson =

American artist

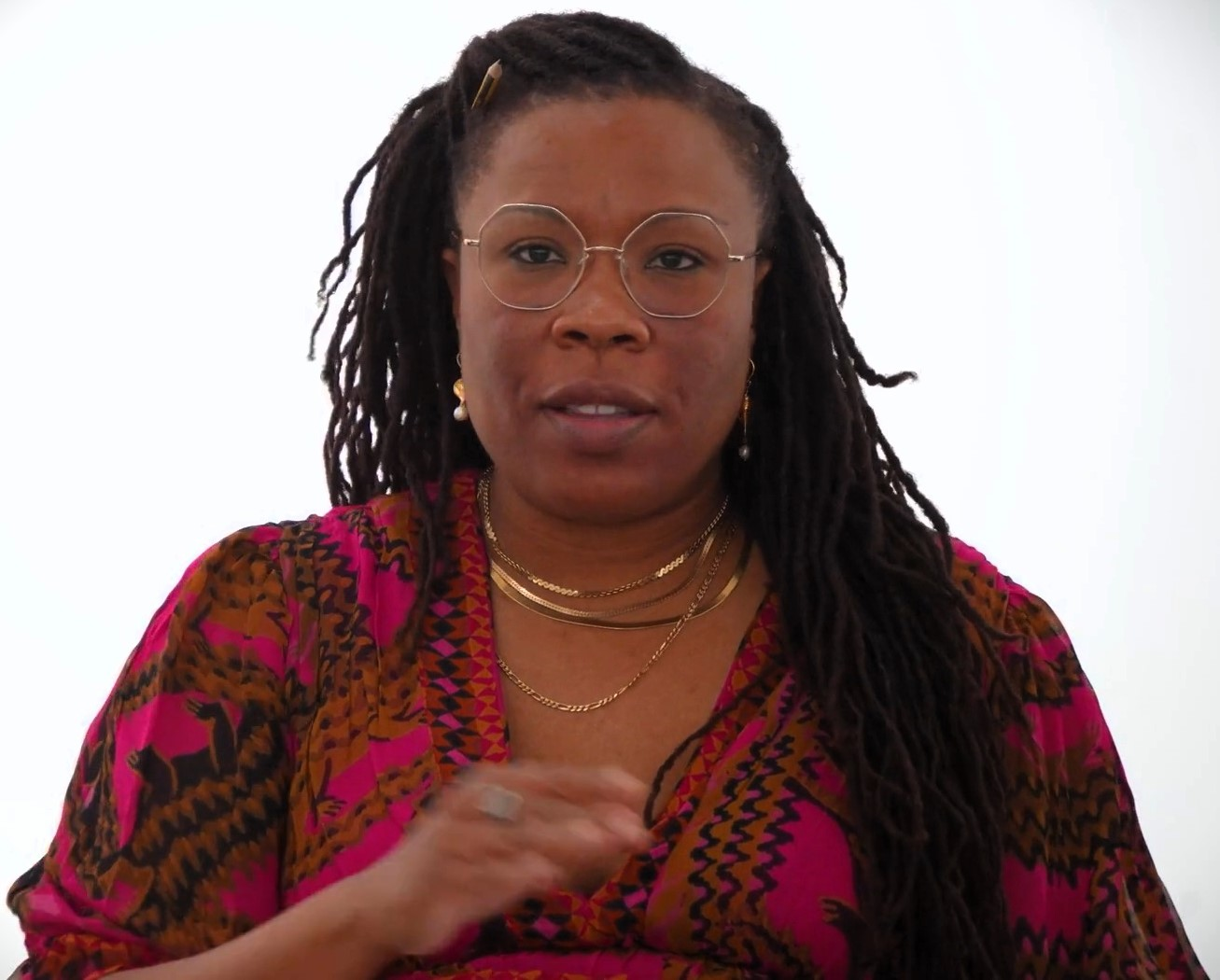
- Jackson speaks in 2024
- Born: 1980 (age 45–46); Houston, TX
- Education: Yale School of Art MIT School of Architecture and Planning Cooper Union

Tomashi Jackson (born 1980) is an American multimedia artist working across painting, video, textiles and sculpture. Jackson was born in Houston, Texas, raised in Los Angeles, and currently lives and works in New York, NY and Cambridge, MA. Jackson was named a 2019 Whitney Biennial participating artist. Jackson also serves on the faculty for sculpture at Rhode Island School of Design. Her work is included in the collection of MOCA Los Angeles. In 2004, a 20-foot-high by 80-foot-long mural by Jackson entitled Evolution of a Community was unveiled in the Los Angeles neighborhood of West Adams. In March 2026, she was awarded one of The Wagner Foundation's 2026 Arts Fellowships along with Yu-Wen Wu and Lucy Kim; the award supports Boston-area artists that inspire social change.

== Artistic practice ==
Jackson's work investigates the relationships between the aesthetic and the political. Jackson references layered content bridging historical actions with shifting artistic structures.

Her multimedia practice draws from Josef Albers' research on color relativity, "resulting in works with exuberant color, bold geometry, and intricate layerings of material." Jackson first became interested in Albers' work while studying painting and printmaking at Yale University. At the time she noted that the language Albers used to describe color perception phenomenon mirrored the language around racial segregation found in education policy and the transcripts of civil rights court cases fought by Thurgood Marshall and the NAACP Legal Defense and Education Fund. This analysis led Jackson to use color theory as an aesthetic strategy to investigate and connect past and present. "Color theory and human rights are conceptually interwoven in my paintings," said the artist. "I find the language comparisons appropriate metaphors for a critique of racism rather than a critique of categories of race."

Incorporating images painted from photographs and other materials chosen for their formal qualities, Jackson's work "bridges gaps between geometric experimentation and the systematization of injustice."

Jackson is interested in movement and migration, in particular how these activities are curtailed for populations of color. Her project at the 2019 Whitney Biennial compared people of color losing their homes in the 19th century, when Seneca Village was razed to become part of Central Park, with homeowners in Brooklyn recently losing their homes under a controversial policy known as third-party transfer.

She was included in the 2019 traveling exhibition Young, Gifted, and Black: The Lumpkin-Boccuzzi Family Collection of Contemporary Art.

== Education ==
Jackson received her BFA from Cooper Union in 2010, MS from the MIT School of Architecture and Planning in 2012, and MFA in Painting and Printmaking from the Yale School of Art in 2016.

== Teaching ==
She has lectured and taught at Cooper Union, Massachusetts College of Art and Design, Rhode Island School of Design, UMass Dartmouth, Boston University, School of Visual Arts, and New York University.

== Curatorial work ==
Jackson's curatorial work includes Publication-Schmublication at The Broadway Gallery, New York (December 2008), Drawing Atmosphere at Super Front Architectural Exhibition Space, New York (March 2008) Fever Grass: A Brief Study of Collective Memory and Waste Management in Dangriga, BZ. at The Cooper Union, New York (November 2008), and Everything There and Not There at The Broadway Gallery, New York (August 2008).

== Exhibitions ==
=== Selected solo exhibitions ===
- 2014 - Love Economy: Emerging Visions of the African American Experience, Michigan State University, East Lansing, MI
- 2016 - The Subliminal Is Now, Tilton Gallery, New York, NY
- 2018 - Interstate Love Song, Zuckerman Museum of Art, Kennesaw State University, Kennesaw, GA
- 2019 - Time Out of Mind, Tilton Gallery, New York, NY
- 2020 - Forever My Lady, Night Gallery, Los Angeles, CA
- 2020 – Love Rollercoaster, The Wexner Center for the Arts at Ohio State University, Columbus, OH
- 2022 – SLOW JAMZ, Neuberger Museum of Art at Purchase College, SUNY, Purchase, NY
- 2024 - Tomashi Jackson: Across the Universe, Institute of Contemporary Art, University of Pennsylvania, Philadelphia, PA
- 2025 – Tomashi Jackson: Across the Universe, Contemporary Arts Museum Houston, Houston, TX
- TBA - Platform: Tomashi Jackson, Parrish Art Museum, Water Mill, NY

=== Selected group exhibitions ===
- 2012 - Brucennial, MoMA PS1
- 2016 - Black Women Artists for Black Lives Matter, New Museum
- 2017 - In the Abstract, Mass MoCA
- 2019 - Whitney Biennial, curated by Rujeko Hockley and Jane Panetta
- 2020 - Slowed and Throwed: Records of the City Through Mutated Lenses, Contemporary Arts Museum Houston
- Her work has been included in the 2016, 2017, 2018, and 2019 Art Basel Miami Beach as well.

== Publications ==
- The seen, the unseen, and the aesthetics of infrastructure. S.M. in Art, Culture, and Technology; Massachusetts Institute of Technology, Dept. of Architecture 2012
- Tomashi Jackson: Interstate Love Song, Jan. 27-May 6, 2018. Kennesaw, GA: Bernard A. Zuckerman Museum of Art, 2018.
- Whitney Biennial 2019: exhibition, New York, Whitney Museum of American Art, May 17-September 22, 2019. New York, NY: Whitney Museum of American Art. copyright 2019
- Hinge Pictures: Eight Women Artists Occupy the Third Dimension, Catskill, New York: Siglio Press; New Orleans, LA: Contemporary Arts Center, 2019.
