= Richard W. Dempsey =

American artist

Richard William Dempsey
- Dempsey in 1952
- Born: September 14, 1909; Ogden, Utah
- Died: October 8, 1987 (aged 78); Washington, D.C.
- Movement: Abstract expressionism

Richard William Dempsey (1909–1987) was an American illustrator and painter, with works included in the collections of the Smithsonian American Art Museum and the National Gallery of Art.

Dempsey was born in Ogden, Utah, on September 14, 1909. He spent his youth in Oakland, California and attended the California School of Arts and Crafts. He relocated to Washington, D.C., where he worked for the Federal Government, first for the Federal Power Commission as a draftsman and then for the General Services Administration as an illustrator.

Dempsey continued his studies at Howard University where he was taught by James Lesesne Wells. In 1946 Dempsey was the recipient of a fellowship from the Julius Rosenwald Fund to create portraits of important Black Americans.

During his lifetime, Dempsey exhibited at the Franz Bader Gallery in Washington, D.C., and taught at the Corcoran School of the Arts and Design.

Dempsey died on October 8, 1987, in Washington, D.C.
