= Wilmer Angier Jennings =

American printmaker, painter, and jeweler

- Born: November 13, 1910; Atlanta, Georgia, U.S.
- Died: June 25, 1990 (aged 79); Providence, Rhode Island, U.S.
- Other name: Wilmer Jennings
- Education: Morehouse College, Rhode Island School of Design, University of Rhode Island
- Known for: Printmaker, painter, jeweler

Wilmer Angier Jennings (1910–1990) was an American printmaker, painter, and jeweler. He was African American and hired by the Rhode Island WPA to create wood-engraved prints that explored themes of economic and social hardships experienced by African-Americans. Jennings' work also included Southern themes inspired by oral folklore traditions. During his later years, Jennings studied jewelry design, which prompted him to develop new methods of jewelry manufacturing.

== Early life, Georgia and the WPA ==
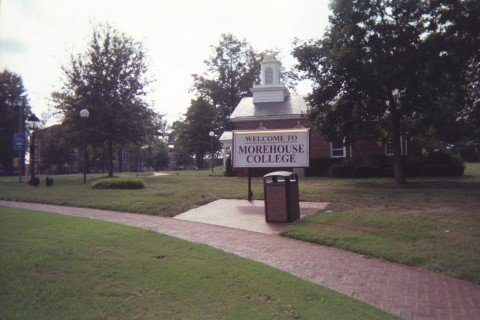
Morehouse College

Wilmer Angier Jennings was born on November 13, 1910, in Atlanta, Georgia. His parents were Matilde and Levi Angier Jennings.

He attended Morehouse College in Atlanta, Georgia, where he graduated with a B.S. degree in 1933. While attending Morehouse College, Jennings studied under the artist Hale Woodruff who introduced him to the principles of modernism.

In 1934, working under the Graphic Arts Division of the Works Progress Administration (WPA), Jennings and Woodruff worked together on two notable murals that reflected on the African-American experience: The Negro in Modern American Life: Agriculture and Rural Life, Literature, Music and Art and the second, titled The Dream. The first of the two was displayed in the David T. Howard School in Atlanta, Georgia while the second was showcased at the School of Social Work at Atlanta University. However, both are currently destroyed. During that stay in Atlanta, Jennings was able to learn the creative production that contributed to community murals. Woodruff already had an unconventional relationship with his students in which he was opposed to the typical teacher role. Because of that, Jennings was able to form a personal friendship with Woodruff, who he called by the nickname "Count" as a playful title, rather than calling him Hale. In regards to this relationship, art historian Winifred L. Stoelting, quoted Woodruff saying:

[...] "I remember they wanted to call me 'Hale' and I was reluctant for them to do that, but Wilmer Jennings always called me 'Count,' a kind of a warm title. I always appreciated it because he not only needed [to] but he wanted this kind of relationship that developed between us."

Jennings continued to work with Woodruff throughout his early career and was able to exhibit his oil painting Rendezvous, 1942, in the First Atlanta University Annual Exhibition of Works by Negro Artists, an exhibition that was organized by Woodruff.

== Rhode Island ==
After graduating from Morehouse College, Jennings moved to New England to attend the Rhode Island School of Design in Providence, Rhode Island. There, he was hired by the WPA where he was able to create works that represented the economic hardships of African-Americans during the Depression. During this time, he mostly used wood engraving and lino-cut relief processes. Wood engraving uses a dense block for processing and as a result, Jennings was able to create thin lines that displayed subtle detail. His Still Life, 1937 used this technique to create a shadowy quality. Lino-cut, however, uses a softer linoleum block which cannot be processed in the same way. Jennings’ Statuette, 1937, was able to emphasize contrast by creating free bold lines.

Jennings was influenced by his African roots and began incorporating African sculpture into his works. Both Still life, 1937 and Statuette, 1937 include images of an African Fang sculpture in addition to the objects found in Gabon working-class households. This included vases, urns, baskets, metal ashtrays, and textiles.

Jennings enjoyed reading and was influenced by the African-American folklore that was recorded by Zora Neale Hurston and by the poetry of Sterling Brown. Jennings's wood engraving Just Plain Ornery, 1938, represents the humor associated with folklore by presenting the stubborn mule and mule races.

After moving to Providence, Rhode Island in the mid-1930s, Jennings represented the effect of the urban development on the black community in some of his works. His prints included images of ferry boats, oil industry sites, race tracks, and the transformation of residential areas.

== Jewelry design and later work ==
In addition to establishing himself as a printmaker, Jennings supported his family by working as a jewelry designer. From 1943 until his death in 1990, Jennings developed a series of new techniques that benefited the company for which he worked, the Imperial Pearl Company. As a head jewelry designer and chief model maker, Jennings was able to reduce the thickness of castings by casting with rubber molds.

And while studying at the University of Rhode Island he was able to teach himself how to cast precious metals using a lost-wax method. He also developed a method to color glass beads using alabaster and crushed colored glass which created a new jade color. His adoption of centrifugal casting as opposed to injection-molded pieces also reduced costs.

After injuring his right hand in 1957, Jennings began to train himself to draw and paint left-handed, which he continued to do up until the time of his death. The subjects of his later work included landscape and social realist scenes of his community.

== Death and legacy ==
He died on June 25, 1990, in Providence, Rhode Island.

Jennings has a daughter named Corrine Jennings, who is a founding director of Kenkeleba House, Inc. in New York City, which is a nonprofit dedicated to showcasing the work of underrepresented African artists. He also had a son, Wilmar Angier Jennings (July 10, 1938 – February 16, 2025), who had worked as an architect.

== Exhibitions ==
- 1935, Arthur U. Newton Galleries, New York
- 1935, "An Art Commentary on Lynching", New York
- 1939, "New York World's Fair", New York World's Fair Commission of Rhode Island, Queens, New York
- 1939, "Contemporary Negro Art", Washington D.C
- 1940, "American Negro Exposition", Chicago, Illinois
- 1942, "First Atlanta University Annual Exhibition of Works by Negro Artists", Atlanta University (now Clark Atlanta University), Atlanta, Georgia
- 1946, "Negro Artist Comes of Age", Providence, Rhode Island
- 1992–1994, "Bridges and Boundaries: African-Americans and American Jews", a traveling group exhibition shown at New York Historical Society in New York City; Jewish Museum in San Francisco; Strong Museum at Rochester; the Jewish Historical Society of Maryland and the Eubie Blake National Museum and Cultural Center (now Eubie Blake Cultural Center) in Baltimore; National Afro-American Museum and Cultural Center in Wilberforce, Ohio; California Afro-American Historical and Cultural Museum in Los Angeles; the National Museum of American Jewish History (now Weitzman National Museum of American Jewish History) in Philadelphia, and the Chicago Historical Society (now Chicago History Museum) in Chicago.

== Collections ==
Year	Title	Collection	Medium
1938	Just Plain Ornery	Metropolitan Museum of Art, New York City, New York	wood engraving
1942	Harangue	Metropolitan Museum of Art, New York City, New York	wood engraving
1946	Dead Tree	Metropolitan Museum of Art, New York City, New York	woodcut
1937	Still Life With Fetish	Metropolitan Museum of Art, New York City, New York	wood engraving
ca. 1939	Lazy Bones	Metropolitan Museum of Art, New York City, New York	woodcut
1943	Xmas 43	National Gallery of Art, Washington, D.C.	woodcut
1939	Hill Top House	Howard University Art Gallery, Howard University, Washington, D.C.	wood engraving
1938	Boat Station	Rhode Island School of Design Museum, Providence, Rhode Island	wood engraving
1941	Harangue	Rhode Island School of Design Museum, Providence, Rhode Island	wood engraving
1945	Plowman	Rhode Island School of Design Museum, Providence, Rhode Island	wood engraving
