= Sam Middleton =

African-American artist (1927–2015)

- Born: Sam Middleton; April 2, 1927; New York City, New York
- Died: July 19, 2015 (aged 88); Schagen, Netherlands
- Occupation: Mixed-media artist
- Spouse: Hansje Kalff
- Children: 4 sons, 1 daughter, 8 grandchildren, 3 great

Sam Middleton (April 2, 1927 – July 19, 2015) was an American mixed-media artist from New York City. He travelled all over the world with the US Merchant Marine, lived in Mexico and Sweden and eventually settled down in the Netherlands, where he "was part of the considerable contingency of expatriate African American artists". Living in Holland from 1961, he established himself as one of The Netherlands' premier artists. His work is part of the Whitney Museum permanent collection, which included him in its 1962 exhibition 40 Artists Under 40 and was included in the 2015 inaugural exhibition for the museum's new building on the High Line.

Middleton was born in New York City and grew up in the Harlem neighborhood of the city. Known for his personal style, Middleton liked to use abstract expressionism in his work, basing his color, lines, and compositions around sound and harmony. Middleton specialized in working with collage.

== Early life ==
As a young boy growing up in Harlem, Middleton often visited the nearby Savoy Ballroom and music – jazz and classical – became important inspirations for his artistic endeavors. Working at the Savoy, he designed costumes, and painted record and book covers. His early painting was heavily influenced by the musicians of the Harlem renaissance, such as Duke Ellington, Ella Fitzgerald, and Billie Holiday. When Middleton was 17 years old, he left Harlem to work on a boat with the Merchant Marines, to get away from Harlem and have time to paint. While abroad, he visited art galleries and museums for inspiration.

== Career ==
Middleton struggled as an artist in the United States, due to his race and status, but he continued to refine his technique, studying with other Black creatives such as Beauford Delaney. In 1956, Middleton won a scholarship to the Institute Allende in San Miguel Allende, Mexico, and studied in Mexico for several years. In 1959, after significantly advancing his technical skills and having the opportunity to showcase his art, Middleton travelled to Europe to paint, living in Spain, Sweden, France and Denmark, before settling in the Netherlands in 1961. Thereafter, Middleton returned to Harlem periodically, but never again held residence in America, despite calls from fellow African Americans to return. Middleton found greater creative freedom in Holland, while holding on to his jazz influences.

=== Emigration ===
Middleton moved to the Netherlands as part of a wave of African-American artists, along with Deborah Simon, Sherard Van Dyke and Lorina Harris. He remained in Europe to escape racism and lack of opportunity for African Americans in the United States, but was uninvolved with the civil rights movement. Because of his expatriate status, and the fact that his artwork wasn’t focused on his race, Middleton’s paintings are largely absent from African-American art collections in the United States. He did, however, become a figure in the Dutch art community, and opened his doors to other African-American artists who came to the Netherlands, helping them gain traction in Europe. Middleton was able to display exhibitions of his artwork in a prominent Dutch art gallery, an opportunity that was limited to very few Black artists in America. He lived in Amsterdam for many years but, fascinated by the landscape, settled in Oterleek and Schagen in North Holland in 1973. Music (both classical and jazz), together with the landscape of North Holland, created the climate for Middleton's abstract expressionist work. His style evolved to reflect newfound inspirations, such as the expansive tulip fields of the country. His paintings became fuller and softer, while maintaining their distinct jazz connections.

Middleton taught at Atelier '63 in Haarlem and at the Royal Academy of Art in 's Hertogenbosch, jobs that provided enough income to fuel his artistic career. He married twice, had three sons, one daughter and eight grandchildren, one great-grandchild.

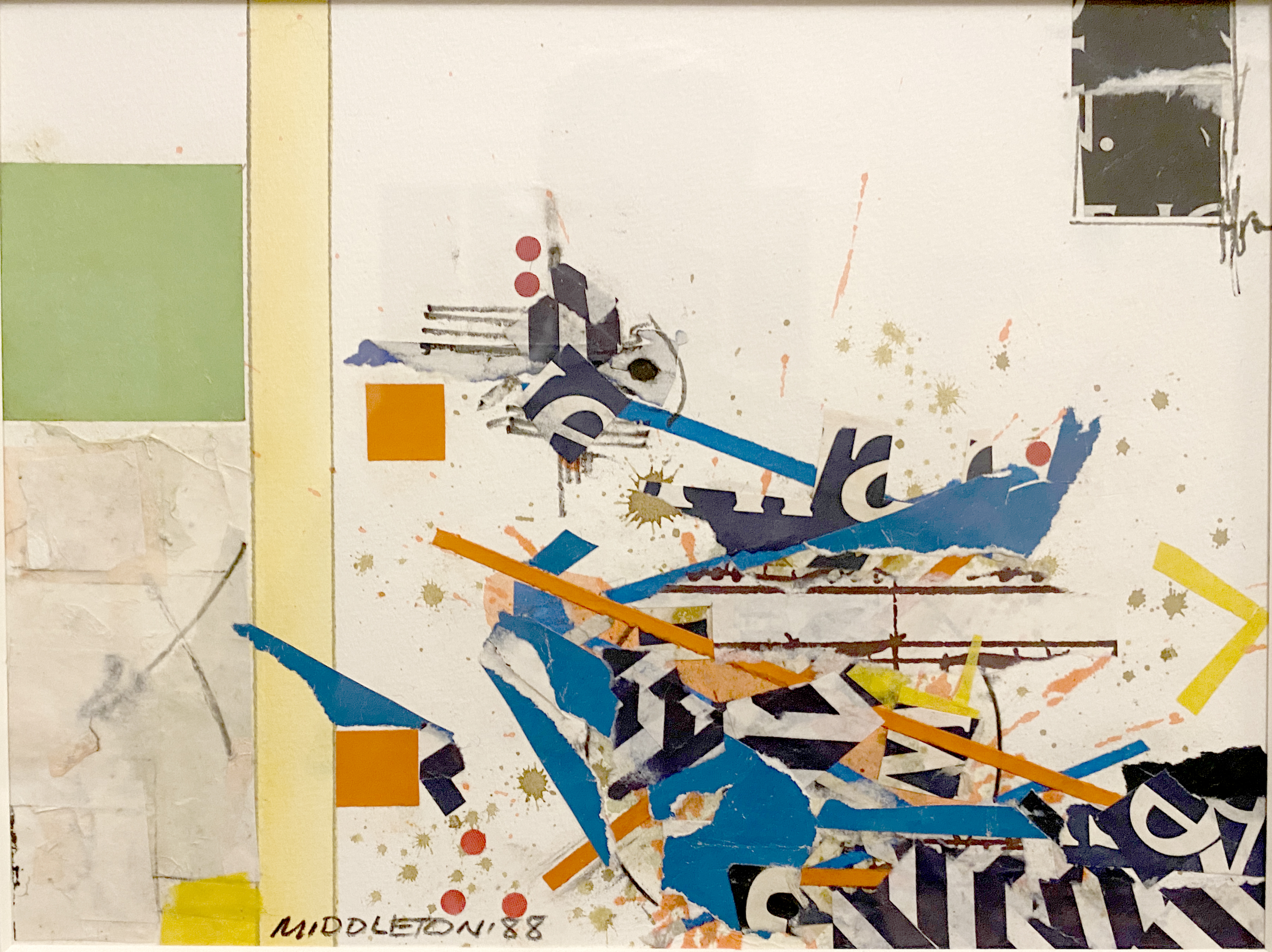
Collage by Middleton from 1988

== List of artworks ==
- Untitled (Mexican Matadors), 1957, part of the National Gallery of Art collection
- Out Chorus, 1960, part of the Whitney Museum collection
- Cymbals, 1962
- Hymn to Democracy, 1962
- Social Realism, 1964
- Everyone's Music Book, 1975
- Summer Wind, 1976
- Black Music, 1993
- Solo, 1993
- Table Top Still Life, 1996
- Monk Lost in Music, 2001
