= Jules T. Allen =

American visual artist (born 1947)

Jules Allen
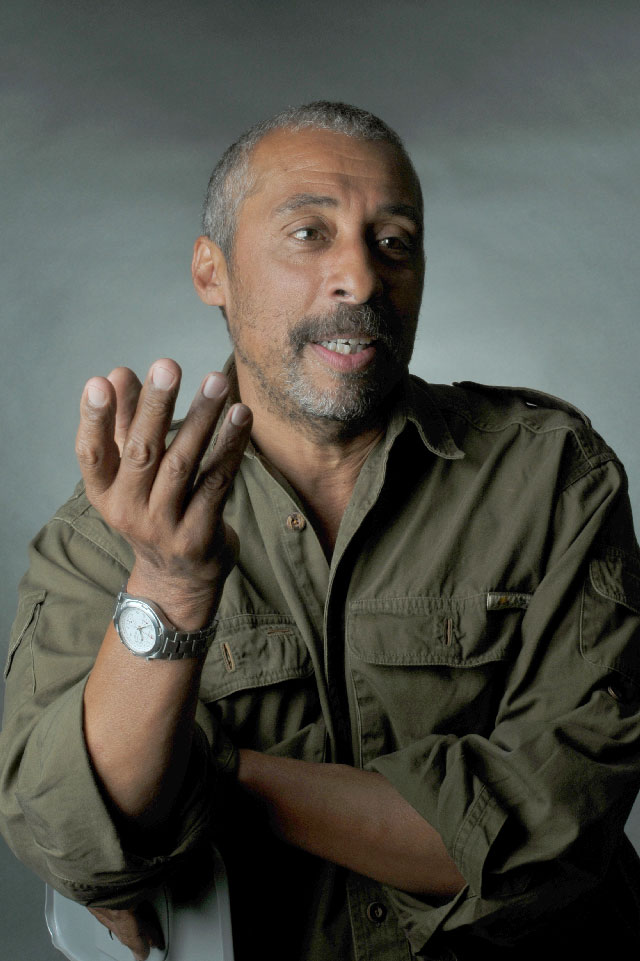
- Born: Jules T. Allen; September 13, 1947 (age 79); San Francisco, California, U.S.
- Education: San Francisco State University, Hunter College
- Known for: Photography
- Website: Official website

Jules Allen (born September 13, 1947) is an American photographer, author, and educator. He is known for his photographs of African-American culture. He is an emeritus professor of Queensborough Community College of the City University of New York, where he has taught for two decades in the art and photography department.

== Biography ==
Jules T. Allen was born in San Francisco, California. He studied at San Francisco State University (BFA, MS degree), under photographer Jack Welpott. He moved to New York City in 1978. He continued his studies at Hunter College (MFA degree).

Jules Allen uses photography as a medium to expose, in his words, “the essential truth”: “that a culture’s power is clearest when presented on its own terms.” He also shares the belief of photographer Diane Arbus, who states, “the more specific a thing is, the more general.” The artist, Danny Dawson has said, "Allen has a “keen eye for the obvious” in his lifelong work evocative of the contemporary black experience. His images place subjects drawn from the richness of black life within universal paradigms. They have inspired collaborations with journalists, visual artists, musicians, playwrights, poets, and filmmakers.

Allen also used his photographs to confront segregation and racism. Allen comments on his collection depicting boxers in Gleason Gym by saying, "whatever racism existed, it did not seem to have much effect on the fighters in the room. It was a question of character. It was a place where people seemed to be more equal". Allen used the boxing ring and the sport itself to display the equality between blacks and whites as they were literally on even ground and the only difference between the two was the character of each fighter. It wasn’t a question of who was what race and who had more privilege, it was about the heart and drive of each of the fighters in the ring. In collaboration with QCC Art Gallery Press, he published “Double Up,” “In Your Own Sweet Way,” “Marching Bands,” “Good Looking Out.” The fifth book, "The Hats And HatNots,” explores the territories of those who make up the overwhelming majority of the black diaspora in the enormous American lands. Its focus, the Hat, and all of its sub-textual trappings: legitimacy, power, honor, righteousness, the glory and resurrection, was released in September 2022.

Exhibited in the U.S. and abroad, as shown in the Permanent Museum Collections & Exhibition listing below, he is the recipient of grants and awards. His photographs are housed in museum collections worldwide. His commercial and corporate work has been seen on covers of national publications such as Business Week, Forbes and Black Enterprise magazines as well as within the Annual Reports of corporate boards and clients within the music industry.

== Permanent collections ==
- New Britain Museum of American Art, New Britain, Connecticut
- Brooklyn Museum, New York City, New York
- National Museum of American Art (now Smithsonian American Art Museum), Washington, D.C.
- Museum of Modern Art (MoMA), New York City, New York
- Schomburg Center for Research in Black Culture, New York City, New York
- Studio Museum in Harlem, New York City, New York
- Queensborough Community College, New York City, New York
- Dreyfus Fund, New York City, New York
- Overholland Museum, Amsterdam, Netherlands

== Exhibitions ==
  - Gray Gallery, Chicago, IL "McArthur Binion & Jules Allen: Me and You," Apr 12 - May 31, 2024
  - Luxe, Calme, Volupté, an exhibition curated by Antonio Sergio Bessa and Allen Frame, Candice Madey Gallery, July 2023
  - Obsidian Project, Virtual Conversation, "Backstory: What is Great Photography? Part 1" March 12, 2021
  - Back to the Lab NYC, Virtual Conversation, Jules Allen & Joe Lewis "Good Looking Out" September 23, 2020
  - Montalvo Arts Center, Virtual Conversation, "How Much Of Sight is Invention" July 30, 2020
  - Kenkeleba House, Wilmer Jennings Gallery, "Visions 1020" March 8, 2020 - May 2, 2020
  - Virginia Museum of Fine Arts, "Patience and Perseverance: The Black Photographers Annual, Vol 4" Nov 10, 2018–May 11, 2019
  - National Arts Club, "The Work of Kamoinge Black Women: Power and Grace" May 28, 2018 - June 30 2018
  - Annenberg Space for Photography, "Who Shot Sports: A Photographic History" Oct 13, 2018 - Jan 25 2019
  - Allentown Art Museum,"Who Shot Sports: A Photographic History" May 4 – Jul 29, 2018
  - Olympic Museum, Lausanne, Switzerland, "Who Shot Sports: A Photographic History" May 25 – Nov 19, 2017
  - Los Angeles County Museum of Art, “Marching Bands Lecture & Exhibition” Mar 2017
  - Tampa Museum of Art,"Who Shot Sports: A Photographic History, 1843 to the Present" Feb 5 – Apr 30, 2017
  - Brooklyn Museum, "Who Shot Sports: A Photographic History, 1843 to the Present" Jul 15, 2016 - Jan 8, 2017
  - Leica Gallery, "Double Up" Solo Exhibition, New York, NY, Nov 16, 2012 - Jan 5, 2013
  - International Center of Photography, New York Street Stories, Lecture/Seminar, New York, NY, May 11, 2012
  - Southeast Queens Camera Club, Jamaica, NY, Lecture Apr 17, 2012
  - SOHO Photo Gallery, PhotoGroup Salon, Group Lecture, New York, NY, Jan 18, 2012
  - Propositions on the Permanent Collection, Group Exhibition, Studio Museum of Harlem, New York, NY, 2009
  - Marching Bands Exhibit, Solo Exhibition, The Jazz Gallery, New York, NY, 2006
  - Photographs: Jules Allen, Solo Exhibition, Institute of African Affairs, NY University, New York, NY, 2006
  - Imagenes Havana, Group Exhibition of Latin, Caribbean and U.S. photographers, Santiago/Havana, Cuba, co-sponsored by Fototeca and The Washington Post, 2004
  - Americanos, Group Exhibition, Smithsonian Institution; shown in 26 cities across the US, 2002
  - Life of the City, Group Exhibition, Permanent Collection, Museum of Modern Art, New York, NY, 2002
  - Committed to the Image, Group Exhibition, Brooklyn Museum of Art, New York, NY, 2001
  - Harlem, Group Exhibition, Leica Gallery, New York, NY, 2000
  - Black New Yorkers/ Black New York, Group Exhibition, Schomburg Center, New York, NY, 1999
  - Americanos: Latino Life in the United States, Group Exhibition, Museum of the City of New York, NY, 1999
  - Living for the City, Group Traveling Exhibition, Parsons School of Design, New York, NY, 1997
  - Icon to Narrative: Harlem, Group Exhibition, IRADAC Center, New York, NY, 1998
  - Domestic Abuse Awareness Project, Group Exhibition & Auction, Kent Gallery, New York, NY, 1997
  - Million Man March, Group Exhibition, Del Pryor Galleries, Detroit, MI, 1997
  - Hats and Hat Nots, Solo Exhibition, Drew University, New Jersey, 1995
  - Gesture and Pose, Group Exhibition, Museum of Modern Art, New York, NY, 1994
  - Our Town, Group Exhibition, Burden Gallery, New York, NY, 1993
  - In the Ring, Solo Exhibition, Snug Harbor Cultural Center, Staten Island, NY, 1993
  - In the Ring, Solo Exhibition, Newhouse Center for Contemporary Art, Staten Island, NY, 1993
  - Hats and Hat Nots, Solo Exhibition, QCC Art Gallery, CUNY, Bayside, Queens, NY, 1993
  - Public Photographs, Solo Exhibition, 60 Bus Shelters, Harlem, NY, Public Art Fund, New York, NY, 1992
  - Songs of My People, Group Exhibition, Corcoran Gallery, Washington, D.C., 1992
  - Songs of My People, Group Exhibition, Museum of the City of New York, NY, 1992
  - Fighting Spirit, Solo Exhibition, Delta Axis Arts Center, Memphis, TN, 1992
  - Group Exhibition, De Meervaart Cultural Center, Amsterdam, The Netherlands, 1991
  - Two Photographers, Group Exhibition, Geneva, Switzerland, 1991
  - On the Edge, Group Exhibition, Henry Street Settlement House, New York, NY, 1991
  - Mean Streets, Group Exhibition Museum of Modern Art, New York, NY, 1991
  - Contemporary Urban Images, Group Exhibition Studio Museum in Harlem, New York, NY, 1990
  - The Knife, Group Exhibition, Agnes B. Gallery, Paris France, 1990
  - Black USA, Group Exhibition, Overhollander Museum, Amsterdam, The Netherlands, 1990
  - Photography and the Culture Climate, Solo Exhibition, University of Michigan, Ann Arbor, 1989
  - A Little More Towards the Light, Solo Exhibition, Shadow Image Gallery, New York, NY, 1989

== Press & Publications ==
- Oral History Project, interview by Basie Allen, Bomb Magazine, Issue 172, Summer 2025
- Resident Artist, Lucas Artists Residency Program, Montalvo, CA May 2025
- Our Times Together: A Conversation Among Friends, Celebrating David Hammons, Hauser & Wirth, New York, NY, May 7 2025
- David Hammons Day's End, Whitney Museum of Art, NY, Yale University Press, New Haven, CT, 2024
- New York Times Styles Magazine, "The Secret Art of David Hammons", Nicole Acheampong, Sept 2024
- NewCity Art, review, “McArthur Binion & Jules Allen: Me and You” at Gray Chicago, C.V. Young, May 2024
- Photograph Magazine, "McArthur Binion & Jules Allen: Me and You" May 2024, Vol. 19, No. 5 McArthur Binion and Jules Allen, Me and You, Introduction by Dr. Thulani Davis, Grey Gallery, Apr 2024
- Frieze Magazine, "McArthur Binion on Visualizing Music," Photographs by Jules Allen, August 2022
- The Slowdown, In Detroit, McArthur Binion and Henry Threadgill Salute Their Decades-Long Friendship Through Song, June 2022
- Ebony Magazine, "Jules Allen: The Art of Afro-normalism," Joicelyn Dingle, September 2021
- The Root GlowUp, "The Exhibit ‘Black Women: Power and Grace’," Veronica Webb, May 2018
- The New York Times, "Celebrating the Grace of Black Women," Antwaun Sargent, May 2018
- New York Review of Books," "The Thrill of the Black Marching Band," Salamishah Tillet, February 2017
- "Who Shot Sports: A Photographic History, 1843 to the Present" Gail Buckland, Alfred A. Knopf, New York, 2016
- Life Force Magazine, Photo Essay, Marching Bands, Mar 2016
- CUNY Radio Podcast, Precision, Pomp & Cultural Touchstone, Book Beat, QCC, Feb 29, 2016
- Queens Courier, Bayside Professor Celebrates Black Marching Bands, Alina Suriel, Feb 16, 2016
- Times Ledger, News & Books, Tom Momberg, Feb 5, 2016
- The Guardian, Soul, Swagger and Spectacle: America's Black Marching Bands, Jan 12, 2016
- The New York Times, Lens Blog, David Gonzalez, Dec 30, 2015
- The New York Times, "Black Marching Bands, It’s About Rhythm, Precision and Flair" National Print, Sports Section, Dec 30, 2015
- Salute to Scholars, "Head of the Class, Photographer Jules Allen" Publication of CUNY, Winter 2015
- Black Renassiance Noire, "Photographic Series on Black Marching Bands", Vol 14, Issue 2, Winter 2014
- Jersey City Magazine, "The Studio, Jules Allen", Kate Rounds, Editor, Fall-Winter 2013/2014
- QCC Presidential Lecture: Jules T. Allen: Conjure, Light, Forward Momentum BaysidePatch.com, Apr 2, 2013
- The New Yorker Review; Goings On About Town, Dec 16, 2012
- Excellence in Faculty Scholarship Award, Queensborough Community College, Apr 20, 2012
- The New York Times, Metropolitan Section, David Gonzalez, Oct 16, 2011
- The New York Times, Lens Blog, David Gonzalez, Oct 14, 2011
- Killens Review of Arts & Letters, Portfolio, Clarence Reynolds, Fall/Winter 2010
- Artists & Influence, Hatch Billups Collection, Vol XXIX, 2010M
- New Times Holler, Amir Bey, May 6, 2009
- The Black Photographers Annual, Volume 1-4; Feature Stories, Volume 4, 1980, pages 88-93

== Awards & Honors ==
- Award, CAPS, Photography, New York, New York, 1980
- Photography Grant, New York Foundation for the Arts, New York, New York, 1985
- Grant, Light Work, Syracuse, New York, 1986
- Photography Grant, New York Foundation for the Arts, 1991
- Award, New York Council of the Arts, & Public Art Fund Presentation; “60 Bus Stop Shelters,” City College of New York, New York, 1992
- Research & Photography Grant Funding, City University of New York, NY, New York Foundation for the Arts, New York, 1994–99; 2001
- Imagines Havana, Documentary Photography Panel, Seminar for Latin, Caribbean and US photographers; co-sponsored by The Washington Post and Fototeca, 2003
- Research & Photography Grant Funding, CETL Grants & Awards City University of New York, New York, 2003
- Research & Photography Grant Funding, CETL Grants & Awards City University of New York, New York, 2004–2009
- Southeast Queens Camera Club, Jamaica, New York, Lecture April 17, 2012
- Excellence in Faculty Scholarship Award, Queensborough Community College, April 20, 2012
