= Vaughn Spann =

American contemporary artist

- Born: 1992 (age 33–34); Orlando, Florida, US
- Occupations: Painter, Printmaker

Vaughn Spann (born 1992, Orlando, Florida) is an American contemporary artist working primarily on printmaking and painting. His style moves between abstraction and figuration, and at times incorporates symbols such as the letter X into his paintings.

== Early life and education ==
Vaughn Spann was born in Orlando, Florida, in 1992. He completed a Bachelor of Fine Arts at Rutgers University, New Jersey, in 2014, and received a Master of Fine Arts degree in painting and printmaking from the Yale School of Art, New Haven, in 2018.

== Work ==
Vaughn has been shown at the Tampa Museum, Rubell Museum, Florida; the Pérez Art Museum, Florida; the Kemper Museum of Contemporary Art, Missouri, and others. In 2020 he was one of Forbes "30 Under 30 in Art and Style" alongside Grace Lynne Raynes, Ilana Harris-Babou, Farah Al Qasimi, and Louis Fratino.

The solo show Vaughn Spann: Trilogy was on view at Almine Rech gallery, New York, in 2023. The abundance of blues in his paintings have been associated with Stéphane Mallarmé’s 1864 poem “L’Azur.”

In 2024, the Tampa Museum of Art displayed the one-person presentation Vaughn Spann: Allegories, a series of four large-scale mixed media prints on wood panels. Compositions in the show expanded on the artist's vocabulary such as the "X" shape in combination with art historical references.

== Collections ==
His work is held in institutions including the Pérez Art Museum Miami, High Museum of Art, Atlanta; North Carolina Museum of Art; Brooklyn Museum, New York; Hirshhorn Museum and Sculpture Garden, Washington DC; Los Angeles County Museum of Art, California; and the Buffalo AKG Art Museum, New York, among others.
