= Gilda Snowden =

African-American artist

- Born: July 29, 1954; Detroit, Michigan, United States
- Died: September 9, 2014 (aged 60)
- Education: Wayne State University
- Known for: painting
- Style: Abstraction
- Spouse: William "Bill" Boswell II
- Children: 1
- Awards: Kresge Arts Fellowship

Gilda Snowden (July 29, 1954 – September 9, 2014) was an African-American artist, educator and mentor from Detroit, Michigan.

== Early life and education ==
Snowden was born in Detroit, Michigan on July 29, 1954, and grew up in northwest Detroit. Snowden's father was a dentist. Her parents and grandparents migrated from Alabama and Texas to Detroit early in the 20th century, part of the mass movement of African Americans from the rural South to the urban North. She attended Cass Technical High School with a focus on fashion design.

Snowden earned her earned her BFA degree in Advertising Design and Painting in 1977 and her MFA degree in Painting in 1979 from Wayne State University. She decided her sophomore year of college to focus on fine art. At Wayne State University, she was heavily influenced by the Cass Corridor art movement and studied with artist John Egner.

She was married to William "Bill" Boswell, an actor and director of the Detroit Repertory Theatre.

== Teaching ==
In 1985, Gilda Snowden became a professor in Department of Fine Arts at the College for Creative Studies (CCS) in Detroit. She taught at CCS for 31 years, serving as chair for both the fine arts department and the painting department at various times during her years there. At the college she also served as a curator and juror for art exhibitions.

== Work ==
Gilda Snowden's works are predominately abstracts that utilize vivid color. The city of Detroit sparked several bodies of work. Her Flora Urbana series features abstracted floral forms, in encaustic, inspired by the gardens now tended by Detroit citizens on plots where buildings once stood. City Album: Department of Railways 1929 is an example from a series of charcoal rubbings she made of the Detroit manhole covers she discovered riding though the city on her bicycle.

Snowden describes all of her works as autobiographical including an extensive series Self-Portrait of over one hundred self-portraits of the back of her head and shoulders. She has cited her experience of race, gender and fears she felt as a child as the inspiration for this series. She began again with the series after growing her hair out in the 2000s and using computer projections to help create her pieces. Monument [1988], found at the Detroit Institute of Arts, as "a chronicle of my family on their travels from Alabama to Detroit. We are all looking for something, all traveling from here to there."

She was a member of the Michigan chapter of the National Conference of Artists. This organization helped Snowden exhibit her work internationally throughout her career.

Over the course of her career, Snowden served as an advisor on the DIA Friends of Modern Art Board, a member of the advisory board of the Scarab Club, a member of the Educational Advisory Board for the Art Education Department of the College for Creative Studies, and a gallery directory for the Detroit Repertory Theater.

== Awards and honors ==
Among the honors which Gilda Snowden has earned are:

- 2009 – Kresge Arts Fellowship from The Kresge Foundation.
- 1982, 1985, 1990 in Painting, 1988 in Sculpture – Individual Artists Grant from the Michigan Council For the Arts.
- 1977–1979 – Graduate Professional Scholarship, Wayne State University
- 1990 – Tannahill Faculty Grant, Center for Creative Studies
- 1990 – Arts Midwest NEA Regional Fellowship

== Exhibitions ==
Gilda Snowden's work has been featured in gallery and museum, this is a select list of her exhibitions including:

=== Solo exhibitions ===
- 2013 – Gilda Snowden, Album: A Retrospective 1977-2010, (solo exhibition) Oakland University Art Gallery, Rochester, New York, United States
- 2006 – Abstractions of Life Paintings, (solo exhibition) Sherry Washington Gallery, Detroit, Michigan, United States
- 2002 – Gilda Snowden, New Work, (solo exhibition) Sherry Washington Gallery, Detroit, Michigan, United States
- 1986 – Paint Creek Center, Rochester, Michigan, United States

=== Group exhibitions ===
- 2014 – Another Look at Detroit (Part I and II), Marianne Boesky Gallery, Chelsea, New York City, New York, United States
- 1993 – TransFORMING IDEAS, Michigan Gallery, Detroit, Michigan
- 1992 – Women of Color, Dahl Arts Center, Rapid City, South Dakota, United States
- 1991 – Detroit Institute of Art, Detroit (DIA), Michigan, United States
- 1990 – Signature Images, (with artist Michael Luchs, curated by Jan van der Marck), Detroit Institute of Art (DIA), Detroit, Michigan, United States

== Death and legacy ==
Snowden died on September 9, 2014, at the age of 60.

Snowden's work is held in permanent museum collections including Detroit Institute of Arts, the David C. Driskell Center at the University of Maryland, Oakland University Art Gallery, and the Wayne State University Art Collection.

The Gilda Snowden Emerging Artist Awards, funded by The Kresge Foundation since 2015, honor Gilda Snowden's lifetime of work mentoring Detroit area emerging artists.
