= Claude Lawrence =

American jazz musician and abstract artist

- Born: 1944 (age 81–82); Chicago, Illinois, U.S.
- Genres: Abstract art; Jazz
- Occupations: Artist; Musician
- Instrument: Tenor saxophone
- Years active: 1960s–present

Claude Lawrence (born 1944) is an American jazz tenor saxophonist and self-taught abstract artist. Beginning in the 1960s he had a successful career as a jazz musician before switching his focus to painting full-time in 1986. His art is held in the permanent collections of over 40 museums, including the Metropolitan Museum of Art, the Brooklyn Museum of Art, the National Gallery of Art, the Studio Museum in Harlem, the Parrish Art Museum and the Philadelphia Museum of Art.

Lawrence’s art has been described as expressing the rhythms and improvisation of jazz. His compositions, which frequently use bold colors and dynamic brushstrokes, are abstract while often approaching the figurative. Lawrence has stated, "I build a dialogue with each painting. It speaks to me, it tells me where it wants to go, and when it gets there, it’s born. It’s done."

== Early life ==
Born in 1944, Claude Lawrence grew up on the South Side of Chicago. His father was a construction worker originally from the Mississippi Delta. Lawrence began playing tenor saxophone at age 14. He attended a vocational high school for commercial art and instrumental music, where he was classmates with fellow musicians Frederick J. Brown, Anthony Braxton and Jack DeJohnette.

== Career ==
=== Jazz ===
After graduating high school, Lawrence formed The Claude Lawrence Trio and began playing jazz in Chicago clubs. He would also play in groups with members from the Association for the Advancement of Creative Musicians. To make ends meet, he worked a number of jobs, including as a bus driver, taxi driver, construction worker and mail carrier.

Lawrence first visited New York City in 1964, drawn to the music scene there. Over the next few years he split his time between Chicago and New York playing jazz in both cities before settling in New York for an extended period of time beginning in 1968. Lawrence has described moving amongst hippy crowds in both cities, often staying with other artists and musicians. Some of the New-York-based artists he was associated with over the years include Fred Brown, Lorenzo Pace, Jack Whitten, Joe Overstreet and Robert Blackburn. Throughout the 1970s and into the 1980s, Lawrence continued playing jazz in New York and throughout the country. He also recorded an album with the Last Poets. During this time, he also worked a number of odd jobs including painting houses, cleaning chandeliers, teaching Tai Chi and groundskeeping for the University of Connecticut.

=== Painting ===
In 1986, Lawrence began focusing on painting full-time after a psychic friend told him it was time for a change. Over the next three decades, he spent long stretches of time living and working in Sag Harbor, New York, a seaside community on Long Island with a history as a Black cultural enclave. He also lived at times in New York City, Stockbridge, Massachusetts, Los Angeles, Philadelphia, Chicago, Mexico City and France.

In 2013, art collectors Lyn and E.T. Williams Jr. bought a large collection of Claude Lawrence’s paintings and began donating them to museums. His art is now part of the permanent collections of more than 40 museums, including the Metropolitan Museum of Art, the Studio Museum in Harlem, the Brooklyn Museum of Art, the National Gallery of Art, the Parrish Art Museum and the Philadelphia Museum of Art. His paintings also adorn the US embassy in Paris.

Lawrence’s first solo exhibition was held at the Gerald Peters Gallery in New York in March 2015. In 2016 Lawrence’s work was featured in “Modern Heroics: 75 Years of African-American Expressionism” at the Newark Museum. Lawrence's 2019 solo exhibition, "A World of His Own Making," was held at the Julie Keyes Gallery, and in 2023, Lawrence's "Free Jazz" solo exhibition was held at the David Lewis Gallery. Other art galleries that have exhibited his work include Anthony Meier in San Francisco, the LAB in Seattle, the Keyes Gallery in Sag Harbor and Aaron Payne Fine Art in Santa Fe.

In 2024, Lawrence’s Reflections on Porgy and Bess exhibited at Venus Over Manhattan gallery. The show featured 22 abstract paintings inspired by George Gershwin’s revered opera Porgy and Bess. The paintings follow the narrative sweep of Gershon’s epic work of Black love and tragedy. Lawrence painted the works intuitively with music playing, often improvising and letting forms and colors lead the way to the final image.

== Personal life ==
Lawrence is longtime partners with artist Leslee Howes Stradford. Stradford, also originally from Chicago, is a figurative and abstract painter as well as a digital collagist. Together they have held residencies at institutions such as Chateau Orquevaux in France and The Church in Sag Harbor.

== Collections ==
Lawrence's artwork can be found in the permanent collections of the following museums and institutions:

- Parrish Art Museum
- Metropolitan Museum of Art
- Studio Museum in Harlem
- Brooklyn Museum
- The Newark Museum of Art
- National Museum of African American History and Culture
- National Gallery of Art
- American Folk Art Museum
- Detroit Institute of Arts
- Philadelphia Museum of Art
- Baker Museum
- New Orleans Museum of Art
- Schomburg Center for Research in Black Culture
- Guild Hall of East Hampton
- Nasher Museum of Art
- Westover School
- Nelson-Atkins Museum of Art
- Portland Museum of Art
- Colby College Museum of Art
- Long Island Museum of American Art, History, and Carriages
- High Museum of Art
- Crystal Bridges Museum of American Art
