= Ronald Joseph (artist) =

American artist, teacher, and printmaker

- Born: 1910; St. Kitts, West Indies
- Died: 1992 (aged 81–82); Brussels, Belgium
- Education: Ethical Culture Fieldston School, New York, New York Pratt Institute, New York, New York
- Awards: Rosenwald Fund

Ronald Joseph (1910–1992) was an African-American artist, teacher, and printmaker.

== Personal life ==
Ronald Joseph was born on the Island of St. Kitts in the West Indies. When he was very young, his mother decided to come to the US but she could not afford to take him with her. Mr. and Mrs. Theophilus Joseph, a childless couple who were friends of Joseph's mother, adopted him. Afterwards, the Joseph family moved to the Island of Dominica, where they stayed for ten years. In 1921, his foster parents also decided to come to the US. In New York, Joseph met his mother but remained living with his foster parents.

In 1926 Ronald Joseph received a scholarship for the Ethical Culture School, where he spent two and half years of his high school period. At this time he obtained an art scholarship through Dr. Henry Fritz, with whom he became acquainted through his art teacher in public school. Joseph was taken into the Saturday art class, where he was the only black participant. An artistic prodigy, Ronald Joseph had his student works shown at the Metropolitan Museum of Art. Ronald Joseph graduated from Ethical Culture Fieldston School in 1929. He was honored as "the most promising" young artist in New York City's schools. He began his study at Pratt Institute in 1931 and graduated in 1934.

During the 1930s and 1940s, Joseph participated in many exhibitions of African-American art, the Works Progress Administration mural project, and the Harlem Artists Guild.

Ronald Joseph enlisted in the U.S. Army Air Corps at the declaration of World War II and was posted as a member of the ground crew in Tuskegee, Alabama, and in Michigan. At the end of the war in 1945, he received his G. I. Bill of Rights scholarship.

In 1948, he was presented with the Rosenwald Fellowship. The funds allowed him to live and work abroad - first in Peru for two years, then in Paris. Joseph used the G.I. bill to study in Paris at the Grande Chaumière. He described this period of his life as being “independent of economy”. His work from these travels is largely undocumented; according to Rosenwald scholar, Daniel Schulman, many pieces of art are undated or simply dated "1948-1952". After this period he came back to New York without money and work and indicated this as period of hardship.

Ronald Joseph left the U.S. in 1956, disappointed in the unreceptiveness of the art world to his work with mixed feelings about this. On the one hand, he felt guilty for having left the U.S. during a period when blacks were struggling for their civil rights; on the other, he felt "lucky" to have been able to live and work in place where he did not feel discrimination as intensely. He emigrated to Belgium and later settled permanently in Brussels. Ronald Joseph was married to Claire Joseph and they had a son, Robin Joseph.

In 1989 Joseph returned to the United States after an absence of thirty-three years to attend the Lehman College exhibition and symposium and to renew his old friendships. Afterward, he returned to Brussels where he continued to work as a painter, living there for the remainder of his life.

== Artistic career ==
Ronald Joseph started his artistic career in Harlem, New York City at the Harlem Community Arts Center, where he was one of the youngest pupils. Joseph studied lithography and other printmaking techniques with Riva Helfond, who taught him many aspects of the process based on simple techniques, including how to operate the press, and how to prepare the stones. Helfond played a significant role as a teacher of lithography at the Harlem Art Center. Joseph produced his first lithographs under her supervision, and this was at a time when she was just beginning to learn the medium herself. At the Harlem Community Arts Center Joseph met Robert Blackburn, who was his classmate. In 1937 Ronald Joseph depicted Blackburn, in one of his most famous works, that is now located at The Metropolitan Museum collection. Experimenting with lithography and etching, as well as woodblock and silkscreen printing, Joseph explored the techniques of printmaking alongside his friend Robert Blackburn. Joseph described the Harlem Art Center as a "healthy and lively" place, where he had made wonderful friends. In the late thirties, he also served as a teacher at the Harlem Community Arts Center. There Joseph met younger artist Jacob Lawrence and Gwendolyn Knight. They formed a friendship, where they enjoyed conversations and visiting museums together. Both Joseph and Knight would hire Lawrence to pose for them. Jacob Lawrence considered Ronald Joseph to be a very intellectual artist.

In the 1930s, Joseph became chairman of the Harlem Artists Guild and represented it in Washington with Stuart Davis and Hugo Gellert. Ronald Joseph was also a participant in the mural section of WPA and a representative of the Harlem Artists' Guild to the New York World's Fair (1939–1940).

Joseph's early oil paintings were influenced by Picasso, Braque and other European artists while most of his contemporaries focused on social realism. By 1943, he was hailed by art historian James Porter as New York's "foremost Negro abstractionist painter". His pastels and gouaches from the late forties and early fifties showed a highly structured abstraction combined with a studied spontaneity. Ronald Joseph's finely tuned abstractions often incorporated representational elements along with apparently "purer" forms. He described this aspect of his work in these terms: "It's not abstract and abstract at the same time. It's pure creation.” His works from the 1950s employed both still life and landscape as pretexts for masterly exercises in nearly abstract pictorial construction related to cubism and fauvism.

During World War II, Joseph was drafted. After the war he formed "a kind of a group" with Robert Blackburn, Charles White, Larry Potter, and Reginald Gammon and made woodcuts. In 1948, after he received fellowships he traveled to Peru and then to Paris, where his work grew increasingly abstract. When he returned to New York, he lived in Greenwich Village and continued to paint, but with little recognition. In 1956, feeling discouraged about his place in the art scene in the US, Ronald Joseph left the US for Brussels, where he continued his artistic career.

== Selected exhibitions ==
April 16 – May 14, 1937: Exhibition by the Harlem Artists' Guild – American Artists School

1939: Contemporary Negro Art - Baltimore Museum of Art

December 9, 1941 – January 3, 1942: American Negro Art: 19th and 20th Centuries - Downtown Gallery

1943: Library of Congress in Washington, D.C

February 23 – June 6, 1989: Black Printmakers and the WPA - The Lehman College Art Gallery

February 6, 2010 – July 24, 2010: A Force for Change: African American Art and the Julius Rosenwald Fund - Montclair Art Museum

== Works of art ==
Tenement Window (lithograph) - c. 1935, Metropolitan Museum of Art

Robert Blackburn (lithograph) - c. 1937, Metropolitan Museum of Art

Country Scene (lithograph) - c. 1934–36, Metropolitan Museum of Art

The Graphic Workshop (lithograph) - c. 1935–37, Metropolitan Museum of Art

Under the Elevated (lithograph) - c. 1934–36, Metropolitan Museum of Art

Still Life (gouache) - 1950/1954, Harvey B. Gantt Center for African-American Arts+Culture

The Family (paper / gouache) - 1953, Harvey B. Gantt Center for African-American Arts+Culture

Two Musicians (paper) - 1952/1955, Harvey B. Gantt Center for African-American Arts+Culture

Paris Vista (#6) (oil on linen canvas) - 1950-52

== Selected collections ==
Metropolitan Museum of Art, New York, New York

Harvey B. Gantt Center for African-American Arts+Culture, Charlotte, North Carolina
