= Jadé Fadojutimi =

British painter (born 1993)

- Born: 1993 (age 32–33)
- Education: Slade School of Fine Art, Royal College of Art
- Known for: painting
- Website: jadefadojutimi.com

Jadé Fadojutimi (born 1993) is a British painter. Fadojutimi lives and works in London, United Kingdom.

== Early life and education ==
Fadojutimi was born in London, England, in 1993, and grew up in Ilford as the eldest of three daughters. Her father, a management consultant, and her mother, a civil servant, are British of Nigerian heritage.

In 2015, Fadojutimi graduated with a BA degree from the Slade School of Fine Art, London. In 2017, she earned an MA from the Royal College of Art, London.

== Work ==
Fadojutimi's abstract paintings are inspired by source material ranging from Japanese anime to Victoriana chairs, clothing and art history. Her paintings contain both abstract and figurative elements. In her paintings, which are often monumental in scale, she orchestrates color, space, line, and movement in the service of fluid emotion and the quest for self-knowledge.

Inspired by the vibrancy of Japanese fashion and anime culture, Fadojutimi's works are notable for their size, scale, and dancelike use of gesture. After graduating from Slade, Fadojutimi took a trip to Japan. Her second encounter with Japanese culture took place in Kyoto, during a four-month exchange program in 2016, which helped the artist process initial difficulties that came with integrating local culture. Expressing an ongoing interest in anime and Japanese landscapes, she returns five to six times a year to draw. As the artist reveals to Ocula Magazine in a 2020 interview: "Kyoto started so much for me, that's my whole painting language, and the country has this preciousness of a start."

Fadojutimi uses the canvas as a sounding board, grappling with memories of everyday experiences, both good and bad.

Fadojutimi maintains a studio inside a warehouse in South East London.

== Other activities ==
In 2021, Fadojutimi featured in an advertising campaign for fashion brand Loewe.

== Recognition ==
In October 2024, Fadojutimi was included in the TIME 100 Next list of the world's most influential rising leaders.

== Exhibitions ==
1.Heliophobia (2017–2018, Pippy Houldsworth Gallery, London): Navigating through an emotional landscape, the paintings in the exhibition offer a window into Fadojutimi's fractured identity and quest for self-knowledge. These environments capture the feeling of trepidation instilled by the show's title, Heliophobia, which refers to an innate fear of sunlight and the artist's proclivity to work at night.

2.The Numbing Vibrancy of Characters in Play (2019, PEER, London): PEER presents The Numbing Vibrancy of Characters in Play, new paintings by Jadé Fadojutimi in her first solo exhibition in a UK public institution. The artist’s recent work has captured scenes of "familiar unfamiliarity", where distant places and foliage bleed in and out of abstraction, with the paintings naturally relating and reacting to each other.

3.Jesture (2020, Pippy Houldsworth Gallery, London): This is Fadojutimi's second solo exhibition with the gallery and comes ahead of the artist’s participation in Liverpool Biennial 2021 and a solo exhibition at Institute of Contemporary Art, Miami, later in the year. The title of the exhibition, Jesture, touches on a sense of the absurd, responding to the disruption of daily rhythms arising from forced isolation during lockdown. Addressing the exchange between an individual and their environment, the vivid choices of colour and form derive from the associative qualities of the special items that capture her attention and the memories they invoke.

4.Yet Another Pathetic Fallacy (2021, Institute of Contemporary Art, Miami): “Yet, Another Pathetic Fallacy” is the first solo museum presentation by London-based artist Jadé Fadojutimi. Featuring a suite of new, layered large-scale paintings, this exhibition provides a window into the artist's rapidly developing approach to abstraction. Her exhibition at ICA Miami is a comprehensive consideration of Fadojutimi's deep interior world, presenting works that highlight her wide range of techniques, the complex emotions she explores, and the inspiration she takes from her immediate environment.

5.Memory in Translation (2022, Taka Ishii Gallery, Tokyo): This is Fadojutimi's first solo exhibition with the gallery, as well as her first in Asia. Markedly influenced by Japanese animation, video games, clothing, and soundtracks during her childhood, these memories and interests continue to play a pivotal role in Fadojutimi's practice.

6.Why Wilt When? When Wilt Why? A Smile Can Appear in an Echo of Laughter (2023, Zweigstelle Capitain at C.A.S.A. Pallazo Degas, Naples): Galerie Gisela Capitain is pleased to announce the second solo exhibition of Jadé Fadojutimi, taking place at Zweigstelle Capitain IV, Palazzo Degas - Napoli.

7.Connecting in Silence (2024, Taka Ishii Gallery Kyoto): Her second solo presentation at Taka Ishii Gallery, this featuring her latest paintings and small-scale drawings.

8.DWELVE: A Goosebump in Memory (2024, Gagosian, New York City): Fadojutimi’s first solo exhibition in New York. Featuring new paintings and works on paper, the project bears a title that combines the words dwell and delve, suggesting both domestic familiarity and sites that prompt further discovery.

== Collections ==
- Tate Museum
- Institute of Contemporary Art Miami
- Walker Art Center
- Baltimore Museum of Art
- Hepworth Wakefield

== Art market ==
Fadojutimi has been represented by Galerie Gisela Capitain (since 2019) and Gagosian Gallery (since 2022). In 2024, Christie’s sold the artist's The Woven Warped Garden of Ponder (2021) for $2 million in London.
