= Virginia Jaramillo =

Mexican politician

Virginia Jaramillo Flores is a Mexican politician affiliated with the Party of the Democratic Revolution.

In 1997, she was elected to the Legislative Assembly of the Federal District as a local deputy for the Party of the Democratic Revolution (PRD), and during her term of office, she served on several legislative committees.

Jaramillo has subsequently served as Borough Mayor (Jefe Delegacional) of Delegación Cuauthtémoc (2003–2006).
