= Sylvia Snowden =

African American abstract painter (born 1942)

- Born: 1942 (age 83–84); Raleigh, North Carolina
- Education: Howard University
- Occupation: Artist
- Years active: 1970–2007
- Notable work: "The Feel of Paint" Art Exhibition, "Malik, Farewell 'Til We Meet Again" The Corcaran Gallery of Art

Sylvia Snowden (born 1942) is an African American abstract painter who works with acrylics, oil pastels, and mixed media to create textured works that convey the "feel of paint". Many museums have hosted her art in exhibits, while several have added her works to their permanent collections.

== Early life and education ==
Sylvia Snowden was born in 1942 in Raleigh, NC. Snowden attended Howard University where she studied under David Driskell and graduated with a Bachelor of Arts degree and a Master of Fine Arts degree. She received a scholarship to Skowhegan School of Painting and Sculpture in Skowhegan, Maine and has a certificate from Le Grande Chaumier in Paris, France.

== Career ==
She has taught at Howard University, Cornell and Yale, has served as an artist-in-residence, a panelist, visiting artist, lecturer/instructor and curator in universities, galleries and art schools both in the United States and abroad.

== Works ==
She has exhibited at the Corcoran Gallery of Art, Women's Museum, Montclair Art Museum, Baltimore Museum of Art, Herbert F. Johnson Museum of Art, The Phillips Collection, Heckscher Museum of Art, American University, the Mary McLeod Bethune Memorial Museum and National Archives for Black Women's History, and the Kemper Museum of Contemporary Art in Kansas City, Missouri. Her works have been shown in Chile, the Netherlands, Ethiopia, Australia, the Bahamas, France, Mexico, Italy and Japan. Her 2000 exhibition at the Corcoran Gallery of Art featured work inspired by the death of her son. She has received a number of awards including the Lois M. Jones Award for Recognition.

The Kemper Museum of Contemporary Art received grants from the Andy Warhol Foundation and from the National Endowment of the Arts to feature an exhibit on American abstract art called "Magnetic Fields" which included works by Sylvia Snowden and others. According to the museum, this exhibit marked the "first U.S. presentation dedicated exclusively to the formal and historical dialogue of abstraction by women artists of color."

In 2023 her work was included in the exhibition Action, Gesture, Paint: Women Artists and Global Abstraction 1940-1970 at the Whitechapel Gallery in London.

== Selected exhibitions ==
• 2024 The Hepworth Wakefield, Wakefield, UK

- 2021 Parrasch Heijnen Gallery, Los Angeles, CA, "Sylvia Snowden: Select Works, 1966 - 2020."
- 2020 National Gallery Of Art, Washington, D.C., 'Mammie Harrington". Evans Tibbs Collection, Harry Cooper.
- 2020 Arkansas Arts Center, Little Rock, Arkansas, "five Artists You Should Know. A Conversation With Melissa Mesinna".
- 2020 Gavlak Gallery, Los Angeles, California "Nasty Women", Sarah Gavlak,
- 2017 Group Exhibition: "Magnetic Fields: Expanding American Abstraction, 1960s to Today," Kemper Museum of Contemporary Art, Kansas City, MO
- 2011 Group Exhibition: "Artistic Reflections", Brentwood Arts Exchange, Brentwood, MD
- 2007 Solo Exhibition: "Flowers", Parish Gallery, Norman Parish, Washington, D.C.
- 2003 Corcoran Gallery of Art, "Black is a Color: African American Art," Susan Bader, Washington, D.C.
- 2000 Solo Exhibition, "Malik, Farewell 'Till We Meet Again," Jack Cowart, Corcoran Gallery of Art, Washington, D.C.
- 1997 Solo Exhibition, "Works by Sylvia Snowden," Terrance De Vaux, Paradise Island, Nassau, Bahamas.
- 1994 Solo Exhibition, "Sylvia Snowden: The Burns Series", Zenith Gallery, Washington, D.C., Margery Goldberg. (Brochure)
- 1992 Solo Exhibition, "Sylvia Snowden," The National Museum of Women in the Arts, Washington, D.C., Angela Adams. (Brochure)
- 1992 Solo Exhibition, "New Abstractions", Emerson Gallery, McLean, Virginia. Alice Thorson. (Brochure)
- 1991 National Museum of Women in the Arts, "Works of Distinction, Selected Donations and Loans", Susan Fisher Sterling, Group Exhibition, Washington, D.C.
- 1989 Solo Exhibition, "Sylvia Snowden/Paintings '89", Ipomal Galerij, Netherlands.
- 1985 Solo Exhibition, "Paintings and Works on Paper", Brody's Gallery, Washington, D.C.
- 1980 Solo Exhibition, "M Street: Part II", 10th Street Gallery, Washington, D.C.
- 1979 Solo Exhibition (Simultaneous) "M Street: Part I", Zenith Gallery, Washington, D.C., and Howard University, Washington, D.C.
- 1979 "Emerging Artists", Invitational, Group Exhibition, Washington Projects for the Arts, Walter Hopps, Washington, D.C.
- 1976 Solo Exhibition, Seymore Center for the Arts, University of Sydney, Sydney, Australia. (Catalogue)
- 1975 Solo Exhibition, "Sylvia Snowden: Paintings, Drawing, Collages", University of Maryland, Baltimore, Maryland.
- 1972 Solo Exhibition, "Oils By Sylvia Snowden", Coppin State College, Baltimore, Maryland.
- 1971 Solo Exhibition, "Large Oils by Sylvia Snowden", Jonade Gallery, Baltimore, Maryland.
- 1970 Solo Exhibition, "Recent Paintings by Sylvia Snowden; Johns Hopkins University, Baltimore, Maryland. (Brochure)
- 1969 Solo Exhibition, "Painting and Collage by Snowden", University of Maryland, Baltimore, Maryland. (Brochure)
- 1968 Solo Exhibition, "Abstractions by Sylvia Snowden" Mondawmin Center, Baltimore, Maryland.
- 1965 Solo Exhibitions, "Birds of Prey by Sylvia Snowden," Delaware State College, Dover, Delaware (Brochure)

== Bibliography ==
- The Philadelphia Inquirer, Edward Sozanski, "Black Abstraction in Lancaster", April 18, 2004.
- The Patriot News, Zachary Lewis, "Black Abstract Artist Showcase Shared Traits", April 4, 2004.
- The Washington Post, Jo Ann Lewis, "Prized Possessions," September 3, 2000.
- The Washington Post, Weekend, Michael O'Sullivan, "Life and Death and Malik." September 1, 2000.
- The Washington Times, Joanna Shaw-Eagle, "Images of Shattered Youth," August 26, 2000.
- The Intowner, David Barrows, "A Moving Tribute to a Son," September 2000.
- The New York Times, Datebook, "Sylvia: Malik, Farewell 'Til We Meet Again'," September 1, 2000.
- National Public Radio, Jacki Lyden, "Weekend – All Things Considered," September 16, 2000.
- WETA, Around Town 1601, "Sylvia Snowden, Works at the Corcoran Gallery of Art," October 12, 2000.
- Black Art and Culture in the 20th Century, Richard J. Powell, New York: Thames and Hudson, Inc., 1997.
- D.C.Area Artists'97, The Lab School of Washington, Washington, D.C.
- Night and Day, The Corcoran Museum of Art, "Major African-American Collection Donated to the Corcoran," Samuel Hai, July/August 1996.
- Jet, National Report, "Art Dealer Thurlow Tibbs Donates Major Collection of African-American Art to Corcoran Gallery in D.C.," Vol. 90, No. 4, June 20, 1996, Chicago, Illinois.
- The Intowner, Art and Artists: Sylvia Snowden," David Barrows, Vol. 28, No. 4, 1996, Washington, D.C.
- The Washington Post, Lee Fleming, "Sylvia Snowden at Addison/Ripley Gallery," March 18, 1995.
- City Paper, Mike Givliano, "Black and Abstract, " February 22, 1995
- Leslie King-Hammond, et al., Gumbo Ya-Ya: Anthology of Contemporary African-American Women Artist (New York; MidmarchArts Press, 1995) pp. 269–270.
- The Washington Post, Elizabeth Kastor, "Finding Her Muse In Malik", April 17, 1994, 117th year, No. 133.
- The Washington Post, Dorothy Gilliam, "Finding Ways To Stem This Violent Tide", July 10, 1993, 116th year.
- Washington Review, Michael Clark, "Sylvia Snowden, National Museum of Women in the Arts; Sylvia Snowden: Abstract Paintings, Zenith Gallery", June/July 1993, Volume XIX, Number 1.
- The Washington Post, Mary McCoy, "Art: Painter Sylvia Snowden's Visceral Expressionism", December 26, 1992, 115th Year.
- The Washington Post, Hank Burchard, "Singularly Like Snowden", November 20, 1992, 115th Year.
- Eye Wash, George Howell, "Sylvia Snowden", December 1992, Volume 4, No. 10.
- The Washington Post, Mary McCoy, "High-Energy Expressionism", May 30, 1992, 115th year, No. 177.
- Washington City Paper, Rex Weil, "True Colors: Sylvia Snowden, New Abstractions", May 22–28, 1992, Vol. 12, No. 21.
- American Art, National Museum of American Art, Smithsonian Institution, Judith Wilson, "Optical Illusions: Images of Miscegenation in Nineteenth and Twentieth-Century American Art", Oxford University Press, Summer 1991, Volume S, No. 3.
- College Art Association, Judith Wilson, "Sex, Race, and Gender" – Paper, Washington, D.C., 1991.
- The Washington Post, Michael Welzenbach, "Debut With A Difference", September 22, 1990.
- City Paper, Alice Thorson, "Art and Conscience", September 1990, Vol. 10, No. 39.
- Colorado Daily, David Alan, "Artist Sylvia Snowden", November 1990, Vol. 98, No. 47.
- Limburqs Dagblad, T. S. Vallinga, "Sylvia Snowden bij Ipomal", Zaterdag November 4, 1989.
- New Art Examiner, Alice Thorson, "Sylvia Snowden Engaging Expressionism", October 1988, Volume 16, No. 2.
- Washington Review, Sheila Rotner, "Sylvia Snowden: Paintings on Paper", June/July 1988, Volume XIV, No. 1.
- The Washington Post, Henry Allen, "Acrylic Avalanche", November 14, 1987.
- The Washington Times, Alice Thorson, "Two Approaches to the Group Show", July 30, 1987.
- The Washington Times, Alice Thorson, "Separate But More Than Equal", January 29, 1987.
- The Washington Post, Elizabeth Lazarus, "The Experience Exhibited", August 1986.
- New Art Examiner, J. W. Mahoney, "Sylvia Snowden", January 1986.
- Washington Review, Mary McCoy, "Sylvia Snowden: Painting and Works on Paper", December 1985.
- The Washington Afro-American, Charles Farrow, "Curtain Call", March 3, 1979.
- The Washington Post, Jo Ann Lewis, "Arts As A Statement", March 3, 1979.
- The Washington Star, Benjamin Forgey, "Galleries: High Voltage Intensity in Paintings from the Inner City", Sunday, May 4, 1979.
- Honorarium, M Street: Part I. Howard University, Department of Art, Washington, D.C.
- Voice of America, Arlene Stern, Washington, D.C.
- Four Abstract Artists, The Baltimore Museum of Art, Baltimore, Maryland.
- Sylvia Snowden, A Black American Female Painter, University of Sydney Australia Press.
- Resource Guide to the Visual Arts of Afro-Americans, South Indiana, 1971.
