= Landscape with Rainbow (Duncanson) =

Painting by Robert S. Duncanson

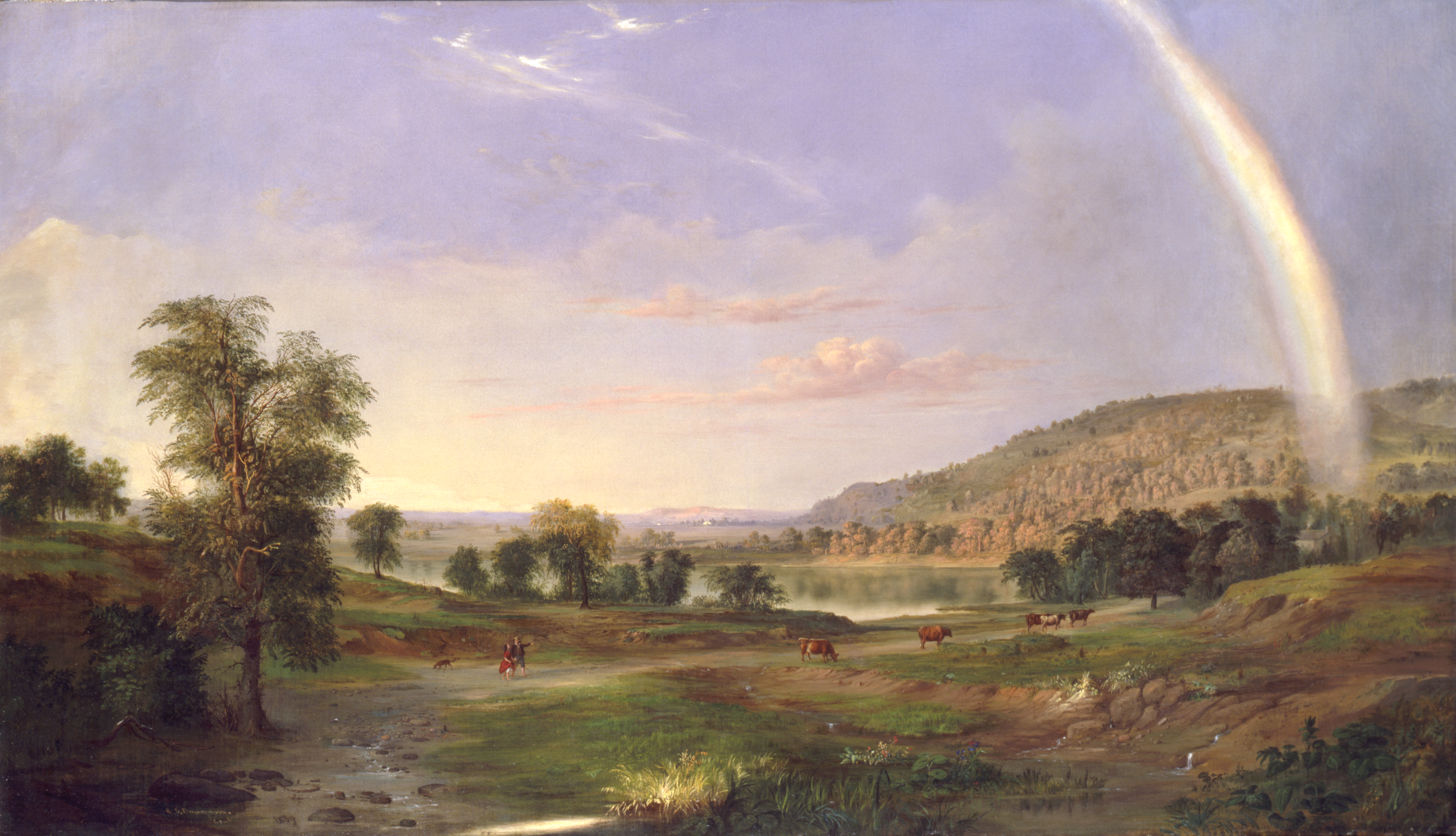
Robert S. Duncanson, Landscape with Rainbow, 1859, Smithsonian American Art Museum

Landscape with Rainbow is an oil on canvas painting by the African-American artist Robert S. Duncanson. The Hudson River School landscape painting was completed in 1859, while Duncanson was living in Cincinnati, Ohio. It has been in the collection of the Smithsonian American Art Museum in Washington, D.C. since 1983.

== Background ==
Duncanson was born in Fayette, New York, in 1821, and he moved to Cincinnati by 1841, where he initially worked as a house painter. He joined the town's strong artistic community, which led to Cincinnati becoming known as the "Athens of the West". Duncanson's landscape art drew patrons, and he worked alongside fellow landscape artist William Louis Sonntag. They travelled to Europe together in 1853-54, where they studied the works of landscape masters including Claude Lorrain and J. M. W. Turner.

Two years after Landscape with Rainbow, Duncanson completed his largest work, The Land of the Lotus Eaters in 1861, inspired by the similarly-named 1832 poem of Alfred Tennyson and by Frederic Church's 1859 painting Heart of the Andes. Duncanson became uncomfortable in Cincinnati as the American Civil War progressed, due to the proximity of Covington in the slave-owning border state of Kentucky across the Ohio River. He left Cincinnati in 1863 to live in exile in Canada and then the UK for several years, returning to Cincinnati by 1867. He died while setting up an exhibition in Detroit in 1872.

== Description ==
The painting measures 76.3 cm × 132.7 cm (30.0 in × 52.2 in). It portrays a bucolic pastoral landscape which resembles the Ohio River around Cincinnati and Covington, illuminated by the setting sun. Amid a scene dominated by the green of the landscape and the blue of the sky, a young couple are strolling with their dog along a track through fertile pastureland, past a large elm tree, following a herd of cattle toward a house in the trees, at the end of a rainbow. The man, dressed in plain country clothes, a hat, and short trousers, is pointing out the house to his female companion, who is holding up the hem of her red dress to reveal a white petticoat. The elm may can be interpreted as a symbol of liberty or freedom, and the rainbow as a symbol of hope or of peace.

The painting has been compared to Niagara by Frederic Church, which was completed in 1857 and widely exhibited to great acclaim. Duncanson's painting was also praised when it was first exhibited, with one reviewer in The Cincinnati Enquirer in January 1860 saying it was "one of the most beautiful pictures painted on this side of the mountains" (referring to the Allegheny Mountains).

Landscape with Rainbow was donated to the Smithsonian American Art Museum in 1983, a gift of the Rhode Island attorney Leonard Granoff and his wife Paula Granoff (née Koffler, whose family founded the American Tourister luggage company).

== Inauguration of Joe Biden ==
The painting was selected by Jill Biden to be presented to Joe Biden as an "inaugural painting" on the occasion of the inaugural luncheon, an event that could not take place during the Inauguration of Joe Biden due to COVID-19. The presentation was done by Roy Blunt, Republican senator from Missouri. It was loaned to the United States Capitol for display for the occasion and was returned to the Smithsonian American Art Museum after the event.

It was selected both because of the rainbow, and the fact that the painter was the most prolific African American landscape painter of Cincinnati. The painting is widely interpreted as hope for the nation after the period of the American Civil War, although according to the Smithsonian American Art Museum, the painting symbolizes "a late hope for peace before the onset of Civil War."

Frederic Edwin Church, Niagara, 1857, Corcoran Collection, National Gallery of Art

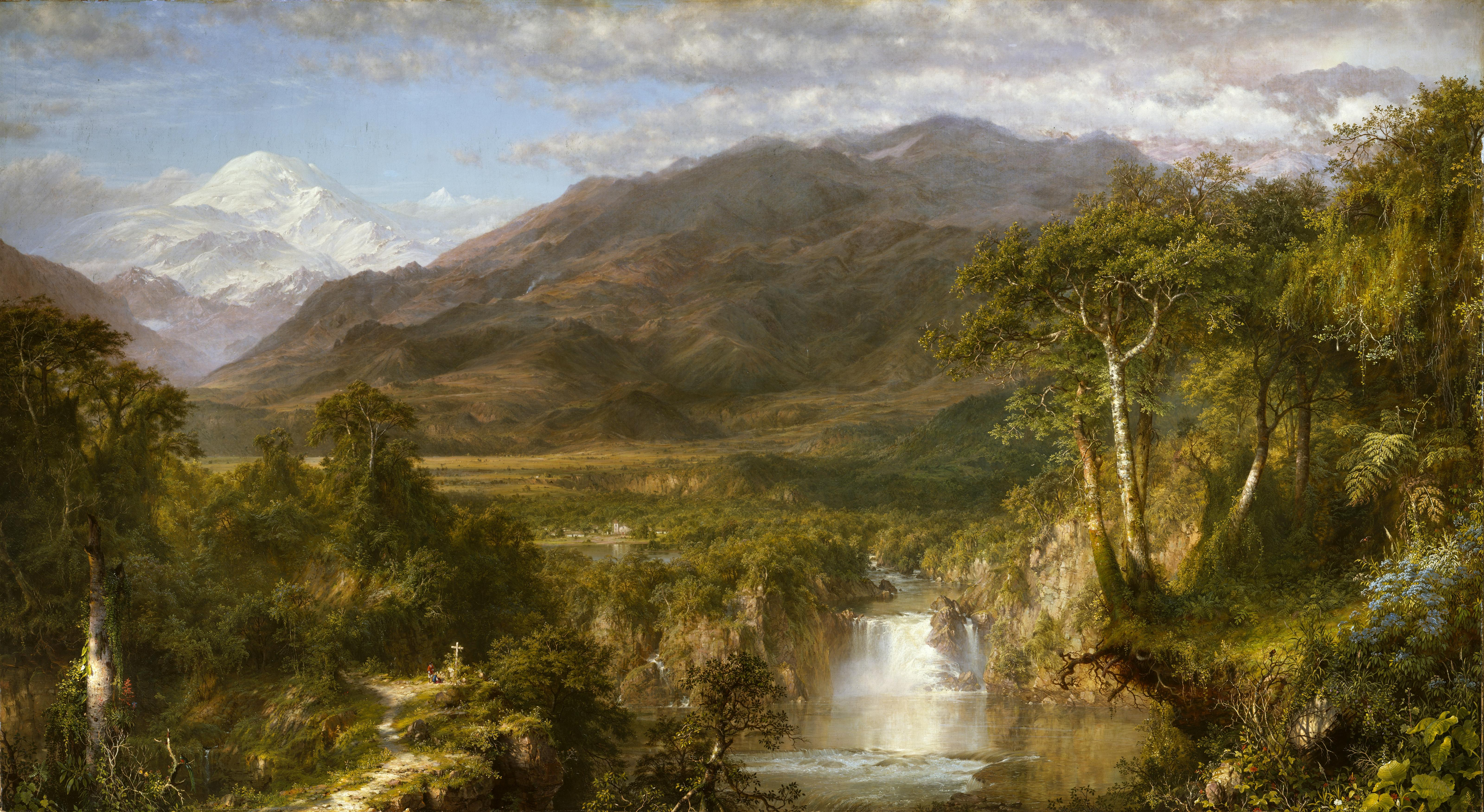
Frederic Edwin Church, The Heart of the Andes, 1859, Metropolitan Museum of Art

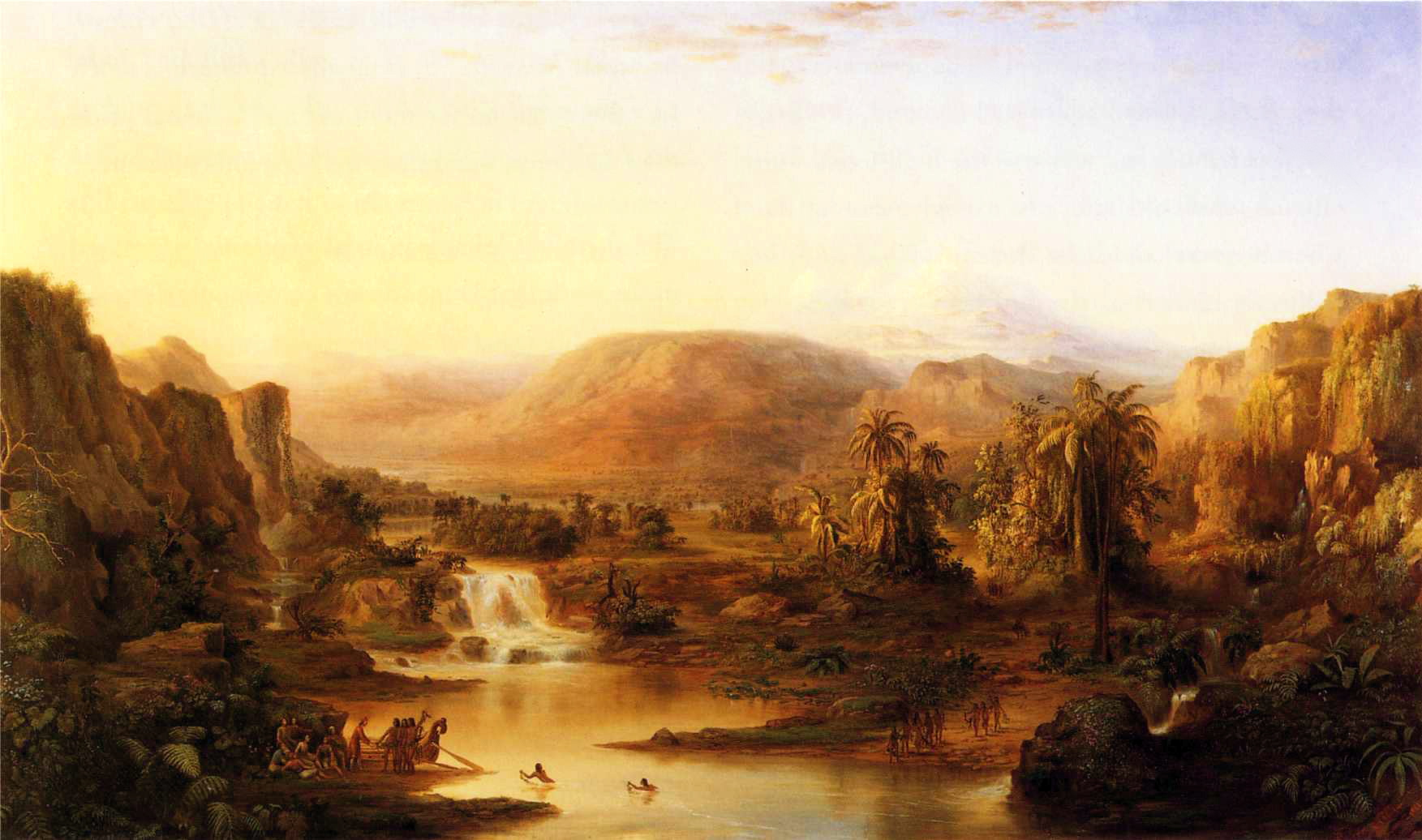
Robert S. Duncanson, The Land of the Lotus Eaters, 1861, Swedish Royal Collection

== See also ==
- 1859 in art
