= Robert S. Duncanson =

American painter

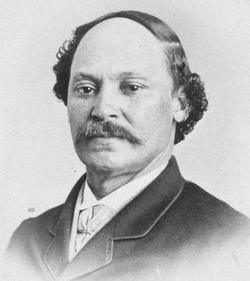
- Portrait of Duncanson
- Born: Robert Seldon Duncanson c. 1821; Fayette, New York, United States
- Died: December 21, 1872 (aged 50–51); Detroit, Michigan, United States
- Education: Self-teaching
- Known for: Landscape painting
- Notable work: Landscape with Rainbow (1859)
- Movement: Hudson River School; Ohio River Valley

Robert Seldon Duncanson (c. 1821 – December 21, 1872) was a 19th-century American landscapist of European and African ancestry. Inspired by famous American landscape artists like Thomas Cole, Duncanson created renowned landscape paintings and is considered a second generation Hudson River School artist. Duncanson spent the majority of his career in Cincinnati, Ohio and helped develop the Ohio River Valley landscape tradition. As a free black man in antebellum America, Duncanson engaged the abolitionist community in America and England to support and promote his work. Duncanson is considered the first African-American artist to be internationally known. He operated in the cultural circles of Cincinnati, Detroit, Montreal, and London. The primary art historical debate centered on Duncanson concerns the role that contemporary racial issues played in his work. Some art historians, like Joseph D. Ketner, believe that Duncanson used racial metaphors in his artwork, while others, like Margaret Rose Vendryes, discourage viewers from approaching his art with a racialized perspective.

== Early life ==
Robert Seldon Duncanson was born in Fayette, New York, in about 1821. Duncanson was one of the five sons of John Dean Duncanson (c. 1777 – 1851), a free black tradesman, and Lucy Nickles (c. 1782 – 1854). Often, it is cited that Robert's father was Scot-Canadian; however, there is no evidence to support this claim, and it is unclear when or where the original source of the claim began. All evidence points to Robert Seldon being the descendant of freed slaves from Virginia. John Dean's father, Charles Duncanson, was a former slave from Virginia who was freed from bondage by his owner. Charles received special privileges, including his emancipation and the opportunity to learn a skilled trade, because he was likely the illegitimate son of his owner. After becoming emancipated, Charles and his son John Dean lived as freemen in Virginia. However, at the end of the eighteenth century, white opposition toward free black men grew in the Upper South. In response, Charles, his son John Dean, and his wife Lucy Nickles, like many free African Americans, moved north. The Duncanson family settled in Fayette, New York, where Robert Seldon was born. Charles' knowledge of carpentry and house painting was passed down to his son, John Dean, and his grandchildren. This knowledge would later allow Robert Seldon Duncanson to develop as an artisan and later as an artist.

In 1828, the family moved to the “boomtown” of Monroe, Michigan, following the death of Charles. In Monroe, John Dean found considerable success working as a housepainter and a carpenter. This success allowed him to support his family and educate his children. During their childhood, Robert and his four brothers apprenticed in the family trades of house painting and carpentry. While Robert's brothers achieved modest success as housepainters, Robert emerged as the most talented of his siblings in his apprenticeships. In 1838, Robert established a painting business with partner John Gamblin. Robert and his partner frequently advertised their services in local publications, like the Monroe Gazette. However, in 1839, Robert suspended the business in order to pursue his ambition to work as a portrait painter.

In 1840, nineteen-year-old Duncanson left Monroe and moved to Mount Pleasant, Ohio, a town north of Cincinnati later known as Mount Healthy, to begin his career in fine arts. Duncanson lived in Mt. Healthy with the Reuben Graham family who were also descendants of Virginian slaves. The community of Mt. Healthy, like Cincinnati, had a substantial free black population. In the nineteenth century, Cincinnati was considered a "'southern' town on free soil”. Cincinnati was a fast-growing city—the city’s population grew from 43,000 to 115,000 between 1840 and 1850. In particular, Cincinnati attracted many freed or escape slaves in search of a new community. The city hosted one of the largest African-American communities in the U.S. Upon Duncanson’s arrival, the African-American population of the city was approximately 3,000. Many of these 3,000 African-Americans living in Cincinnati were previously enslaved. By 1870, the city had 5,900 African-American residents, with an overall population of 216,000.

Duncanson was primarily attracted to Cincinnati for its strong arts community. In the 19th century, Cincinnati was referred to as "the Athens of the West". It was also referred to as the "emporium of the West" by its free black population who had much greater access to opportunities of advancement there than in other parts of antebellum America. During the 19th century, Cincinnati and the American west became well known for its landscape artists, including William Louis Sonntag, Godfrey Frankenstein, T. Worthington Whittredge, and Duncanson himself.

== Career ==
=== Itinerant portrait painting ===
Robert Seldon Duncanson had no formal art education, and thus had to teach himself by copying prints, copying engravings of European works, sketching from nature, and painting portraits. In the 1840s, Duncanson worked primarily as an itinerant portrait painter, like many African-American artists at the time, traveling among Cincinnati, Detroit, and Monroe, Michigan. His first datable work is from 1841—The Portrait of a Mother and Daughter. This work is similar to the style of many contemporary painters, demonstrating Duncanson's experience learning by copying others' works. In 1842, Duncanson had three portraits—Fancy Portrait, Infant Savior, a copy, and Miser—accepted to the second exhibition hosted by the Cincinnati Academy of Fine Arts.^{(p. 15)} While Duncanson's work was accepted into the show, and was well received, it is likely that Duncanson was not allowed to take art classes at the Academy because of his race. This exhibition served as his public debut to the art world, but none of Duncanson’s family members were permitted to attend the show because of their race. His mother, while unable to attend the show, is reported to have said “I know what they look like ...I know that they are there! That’s the important thing.”

Taking a short break from portrait work, Duncanson collaborated with another artist, photographer Coates. Together, on March 19, 1844, Coates and Duncanson advertised a spectacle of "Chemical Paintings...comprising four splendid views after the singular style of Daguerre.”^{(p. 18)} Duncanson was believed to have been the artistic mind behind the composition of the images while Coates took care of the technical side. Although Duncanson was making progress as an artist personally and publicly, the lack of commissions for his work pushed him to move around and work as an itinerant portrait painter beginning in 1845, spending the majority of his time in Detroit.

While in Detroit, Duncanson worked primarily as a portrait painter and was well received by the local press. In 1846, the Detroit Daily Advertiser praised Duncanson for his skill and color usage, adding, “Mr. Duncanson deserves, and we trust will receive the patronage of all lovers of the fine arts.” Portrait commissions in Detroit were forthcoming. Duncanson received his most substantial portrait commission by the Berthelet family, a prominent Detroit family. However, Duncanson became more interested in the genre painting tradition. He was first exposed to the tradition of genre painting through the work of fellow Cincinnati artist James H. Beard.^{(p. 19)} Duncanson returned to Cincinnati in 1846, aspiring to expand his repertoire.

=== Landscape painting ===
Landscape painting was an important genre from the 1830s to the 1900s. Artist Thomas Cole and other members of the Hudson River School used nature to convey ideas about America and its ideals. Duncanson was intrigued by landscape painting. As he moved away from portrait work, Duncanson became intrigued by travel prints, particularly the exploration journals of John Stevens and Frederick Catherwood, Incidents of Travel in the Yucatan. The prints in these books prompted Duncanson to experiment with depicting exotic places and forgotten civilizations in his work. Back in Cincinnati and full of new inspiration, he received a commission from Charles Avery, an abolitionist Methodist minister, in 1848. Not only did Cliff Mine, Lake Superior—the work Duncanson created for Avery—bolster his career as a landscape painter, it also established him within a network of abolitionist patrons who sustained most of his career.

After completing Cliff Mine, Lake Superior (1848) for Charles Avery, Duncanson pursued landscape painting in earnest. Along with two other Cincinnati artists, T. Worthington Whittredge and William Louis Sonntag, Duncanson became inspired by the work of the Hudson River School artists and aspired to paint the American landscape. Together, the three artists set out on a series of sketching trips around the country to provide them with the necessary material and inspiration to bring back to their Cincinnati studios.^{(p. 28)} After finishing the sketching tours, Duncanson focused on the Ohio River Valley in the early 1850s. With his ambitions cast on landscape work, operating on the style of the Hudson River School, Duncanson strived to transform his topographical works into romantic landscapes with literary allusions In order to accomplish this, he turned to Thomas Cole, copying many of his works dealing with paradise and drawing parallels between the imaginary lands painted and America. Around 1850, Duncanson was given his largest commission of his career by Nicholas Longworth to paint 8 landscape panels in Longworth's Cincinnati estate Belmont.The panels have been called the regarded as "among the most accomplished domestic mural paintings of pre-Civil War America." In 1851, Duncanson's created one more well-known landscape paintings from this time period, Blue Hole, Flood Waters, Miami River. In 1853, Duncanson embarked on the traditional "grand tour" of Europe, completed by many contemporary artists, which exposed him to the art world and provided inspiration for many of his future landscape works. In 1859, Duncanson finished his painting Landscape with Rainbow which, when exhibited, was "hailed as 'one of the most beautiful pictures painted on this side of the [Allegheny] mountains.’" This painting was prominently shown during Joe Biden's inauguration on January 20, 2021 when he and his wife entered the U.S. Capitol.

In 1861, Duncanson created his "greatest work": Land of the Lotus Eaters. This painting was Duncanson's most widely acclaimed work. Moreover, Duncanson intended for the work to receive this tremendous acclaim. He planned to exhibit the work on a European tour before he began painting it.

Many of Duncanson's paintings, such as Land of the Lotus Eaters, were influenced by works of British Romantic poets to include mythical themes. This attraction to European poetry and novels was developed through many trips Duncanson took to Europe over a period of 20 years. These trips were funded by Cincinnati-based Abolitionist patrons like Nicholas Longworth and a local Anti-Slavery league. The opportunities provided by these "grand tours" of Europe gave Duncanson the ability to study the works of the Old Masters while exploring the historic landscapes of the European countryside. Two of the works that came out of Duncanson's trips to Europe were Italian Landscape and Italian Landscape with Ruins.

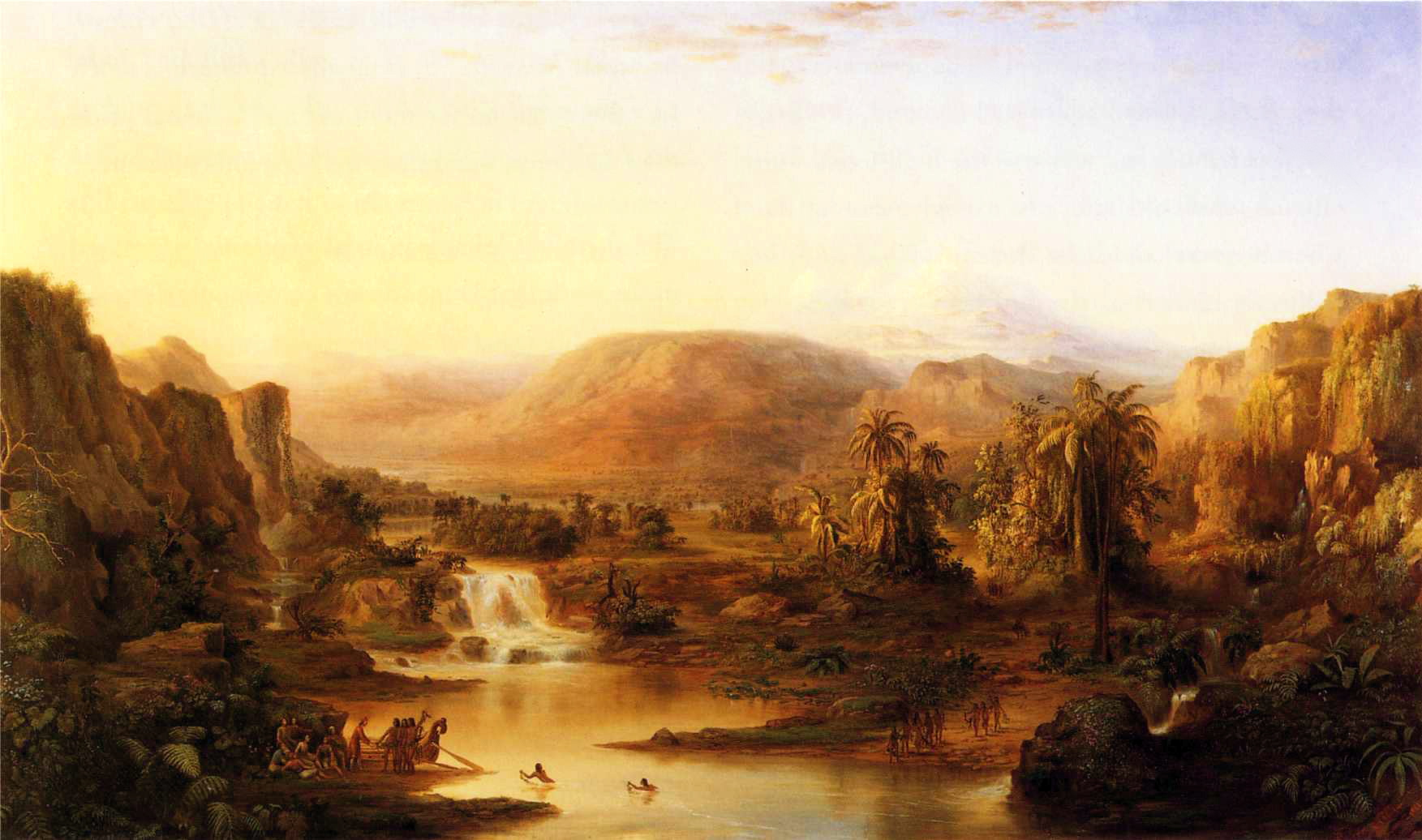
Land of the Lotus Eaters, 1861

=== Abolitionist patronage ===
Duncanson's success as an artist is partially attributed to the many abolitionist patrons who supported him. Abolitionist patrons provided him with ample commissions, acquired his paintings, financed his travel to various locations nationally and abroad, and introduced him to other prominent people in the art community. Abolitionists were motivated to support artists like Duncanson because it emphasized the abilities of African Americans to participate in and contribute to mainstream culture. Additionally, abolitionists would often commission works with overtly racial themes in order to further the antislavery cause. Duncanson likely received even more support from abolitionist patrons because he was of mixed race, as reflected in his complexion and facial features, which likely allowed him greater access into the art world than African Americans with darker complexions. There were a number of other African-American artists who shared these advantages due to their light skin, including African-American painter Joshua Johnston—these "advantages" should be understood in terms of white prejudice against Blacks rather than as indicating that people with some white ancestry were inherently superior artists. The North, particularly cities like Cincinnati with substantial black populations and strong abolitionist presences, was a more advantageous place for African-Americans to pursue fine arts professions. Although Duncanson never explicitly addressed race issues in his work, there is debate among historians on whether or not Duncanson subtly referenced, or alluded to racial problems and racism in the United States. For example, Joseph Ketner II argues that in Duncanson's painting Garden of Eden (1852) "paradise with its palm trees might also be the promised land of slave songs." David Lubin also believed that Duncanson's paintings "may have contained hidden allegories on racial themes whose meanings were available only to certain audiences."

==== Uncle Tom and Little Eva, 1853 ====
Robert Duncanson’s Uncle Tom and Little Eva, painted in 1853, is housed at the Detroit Institute of Arts. This work demonstrates Duncanson's growth in his early years of landscape painting. The painting depicts a scene from Harriet Beecher Stowe's anti-slavery novel Uncle Tom’s Cabin. The painting is a copy of an engraving from the novel's illustrations. While Stowe's novel has many violent scenes that address the brutality of slavery, Duncanson chose to paint an innocuous scene from the book. He depicts two characters, a slave named Tom and the young daughter of a slave owner named Eva, set in an idyllic landscape. Tom and Eva are looking up at the sky—to the heavens and God—at the shore of Lake Pontchartrain in Louisiana. The scene is a critical moment in Beecher's novel related to the theme of salvation from slavery through spiritual love and sacrifice. In the 1850s, Duncanson gained popularity amongst abolitionist patrons. Reverend James Francis Conover, an outspoken abolitionist minister and news editor, recognized Duncanson's rise to prominence in the abolitionist art community and commissioned the work. Many abolitionists would commission works that explicitly portrayed the contemporary racial issues. While some art historians believe that Duncanson's works contained metaphors pertaining to issues of race, Uncle Tom and Little Eva is his only painting that explicitly addresses the racial issues of antebellum America by portraying an abolitionist story. As a free black artist active prior to the Civil War, Duncanson was in a unique position to make statements about racial issues, but he typically did not address these issues explicitly in his work. Although Duncanson’s son urged him to address contemporary racial concerns in his works, Duncanson wrote to his son, “I have no color on the brain; all I have on the brain is paint.” Some art historians, such as Joseph D. Ketner, believe that Duncanson intended to make an indictment of the institution of slavery by depicting this delicate yet profound scene from Stowe's Uncle Tom's Cabin. Other art historians, like Margaret Rose Vendryes, assert that Uncle Tom and Little Eva (1853) demonstrates Duncanson's desire to satisfy abolitionist patrons, and not necessarily his own views.

==== Nicholas Longworth's Belmont Mansion ====
Duncanson's success in the Cincinnati art community brought him many substantial commissions, such as that of Nicholas Longworth, one of the city's wealthiest citizens. In 1851, Longworth commissioned Duncanson to paint murals on the walls of his home, which was called the Belmont Mansion. Duncanson created eight murals for the entry of the Belmont Mansion, each nine feet high and six and a half feet wide, that depicted landscapes of the American West. Although the scale of the job was large, and Duncanson was still relatively new to the profession, Longworth selected him to decorate his home because he thought Duncanson to be “one of our most promising painters.” Duncanson's previous training in the trade of house painting served him well in his work on the Belmont Mansion. Duncanson's work on the murals in the Belmont Mansion greatly increased his popularity in the art community of Cincinnati, particularly among the white abolitionist contingent. The murals were eventually covered by wallpaper, but were rediscovered in 1933 and are now displayed in the Taft Museum of Art in Cincinnati.

==== Work with daguerrotypist James Presley Ball ====
Beginning in 1854, Duncanson worked in the photography studio of James Presley Ball, a prominent African-American photographer, retouching portraits and coloring photographic prints.^{(pp. 101–103)} In 1855, Duncanson and Presley Ball created an anti-slavery panoramic painting titled Mammoth Pictorial Tour of the United States Comprising Views of the African Slave Trade which toured across the country. The work displayed images of the African slave trade, sugar and cotton plantations, and American landscape scenes.

=== Self-imposed exile and international acclaim ===
With the onset of the Civil War, Duncanson exiled himself to Canada and the United Kingdom. In 1863, Duncanson settled in Montreal, where he would work for two years. Duncanson was inspired by the Canadian landscape, as is evident from his works produced then. While in Montreal, Duncanson developed important relationships within the Canadian art scene. He was accepted enthusiastically by the Montreal art community and served as an inspiration for Canadian painters such as Otto Reinhold Jacobi. The Canadians thought of Duncanson as one of "the earliest of our professional cultivators of the fine arts." Duncanson had a tremendous influence on 19th century Canadian art; he inspired the creation of the first Canadian school of landscape painting. In 1865, he left Canada for the United Kingdom, particularly England and Scotland, to tour one of his most well-known works, The Land of the Lotus Eaters (1861). In Europe, his work was well received and the prestigious London Art Journal declared him a master of landscape painting. In the winter of 1866–1867, Duncanson returned to Cincinnati. Inspired by his European travels, he painted many scenes of the Scottish landscape. Duncanson's time in Canada and the United Kingdom allowed him to gain even greater recognition in the international art scene.

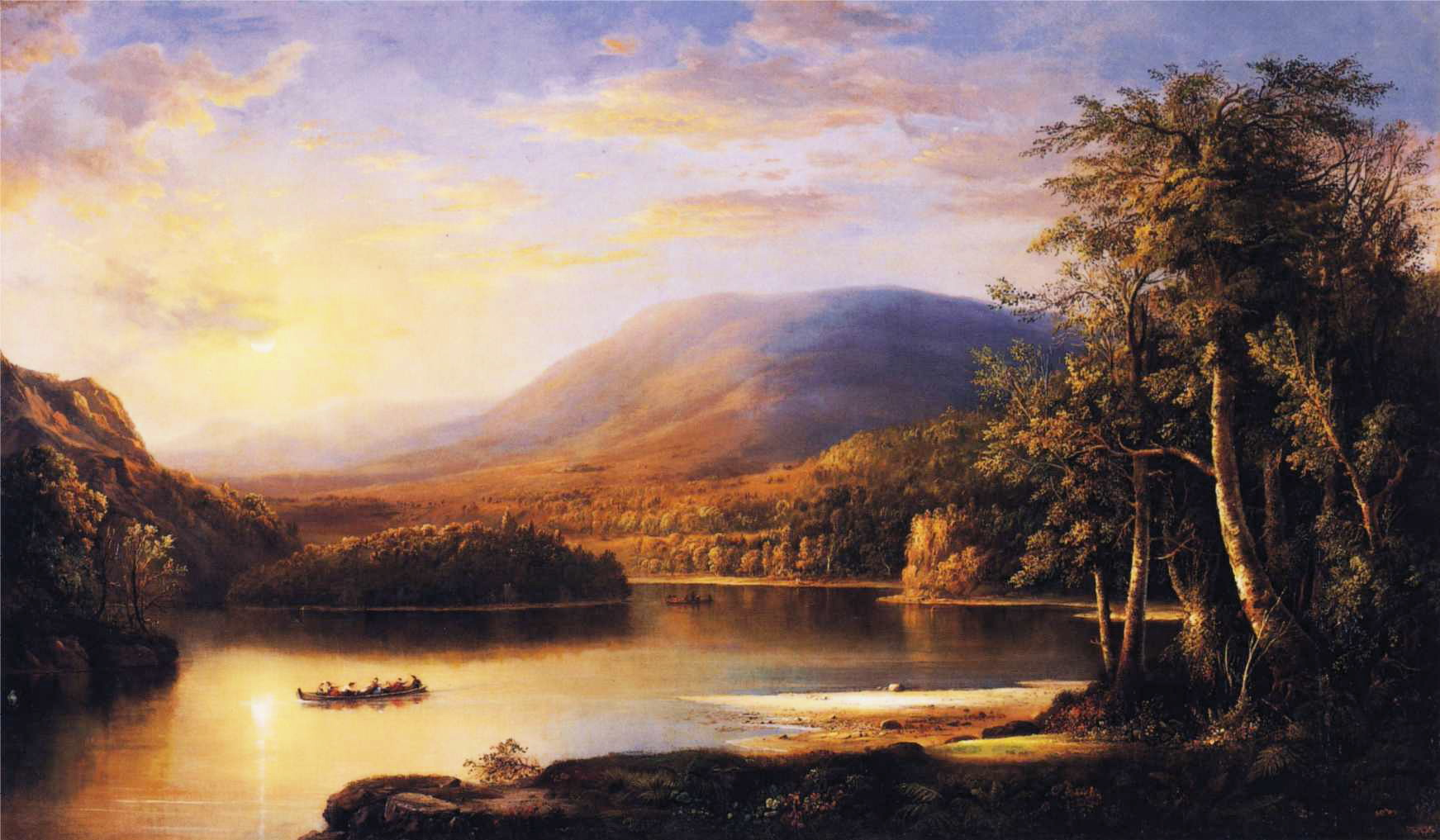
Ellen's Isle, Loch Katrine, 1871

==== Ellen's Isle, Loch Katrine, 1871 ====
This painting was inspired by a selection from Scottish writer Sir Walter Scott's 1810 poem, The Lady of the Lake. The narrative poem was important to several important contemporary African American leaders, such as W.E.B. Du Bois and Frederick Douglass. Art historian Joseph D. Ketner considers Ellen's Isle, Loch Katrine to be the "pinnacle of [Duncanson's] aesthetic and technical accomplishments." The work shows Duncanson's use of the conventions of Hudson River School artists, as well as his own romantic vision for landscape painting.

=== Final years ===
Throughout his career, Duncanson's works had always tended toward the pastoral, and his late works continued to show his love of landscape painting and resonated calmness and serenity.^{(p. 157)} In the final years of his life, Duncanson developed dementia, possibly from lead poisoning. The dementia, and possibly schizophrenia, caused Duncanson to act unpredictably and erratically. He developed a belief in spiritualism and was convinced that he was possessed by a master painter. While Duncanson continued to create artwork, his behavior and declining physical health was alarming to his patrons. In 1872, Duncanson suffered a seizure while setting up an exhibition in Detroit, which eventually led to his death. Duncanson died on December 21, 1872; he was 51 years old. He was buried at the Woodland Cemetery in Monroe, Michigan.

== Legacy ==
Robert Seldon Duncanson was one of few African American landscape painters of the nineteenth century, and he achieved levels of success unknown to his contemporaries. By the 1860s, Duncanson was proclaimed to be the "greatest landscape painter in the West" by the American Press and London newspapers held him in equal regard to other British artists at the time. Richard Powell of American Visions says that Duncanson’s success is a “victory over society’s presumptions of what African-American artist should create.” Duncanson became nationally and internationally known for his landscape paintings modeled after the Hudson River School tradition, and is credited with developing the regional Ohio River Valley art form. Art historian Joseph D. Ketner claims that Duncanson's greatest contribution to art was "his distinctively picturesque-pastoral vision of landscape painting with allusions to popular romantic literature."

Duncanson was largely forgotten from American art history until his work was rediscovered in the 1950s and 1960s. However, art historians maintained a false narrative about Duncanson for several decades. Beginning in the 1990s, art historians like Ketner made an effort to research Duncanson's life and work to develop an accurate portrayal of the artist.

The primary art historical controversy surrounding Duncanson is whether or not he represented racial issues in his art. Some art historians, like Ketner, theorize that there are veiled racial meanings in his paintings, while others, like Vendryes, consider his landscapes to be “race-free." Ketner asserts that Duncanson's artworks are representations of his cultural and racial identity. Vendryes argues that Duncanson did not explicitly represent contemporary racial issues in his work, and warns viewers from interpreting Duncanson and his art solely through the lens of his race, as it may limit the viewer's understanding of his work.

Since 1986, the Taft Museum of Art in Cincinnati, Ohio has maintained an artist-in-residence program for contemporary African-American artists in honor of Duncanson.

== Abbreviated list of artworks ==
- Portrait of a Mother and Daughter, 1841 (Fulton County Arts Council, Hammonds House, Atlanta, Georgia)
- Trial of Shakespeare, 1843 (Douglass Settlement House, Toledo, Ohio)
- Roses Fancy Still Life, 1843 (National Museum of American Art, Smithsonian Institution, Washington, D.C.)
- Mt. Healthy, Ohio, 1844 (National Museum of American Art, Smithsonian Institution, Washington, D.C.)
- Drunkard's Plight, 1845 (Detroit Institute of Arts, Detroit, Michigan)
- At the Foot of the Cross, 1846 (Detroit Institute of Arts, Detroit, Michigan)
- Cliff Mine, Lake Superior, 1848 (F. Ward Paine, Jr., Portola Valley, California)
- Mayan Ruins, Yucatan, 1848 (Dayton Art Institute, Dayton, Ohio)
- The Belmont Murals, c. 1850–1852 (Taft Museum, Cincinnati, Ohio)
- Blue Hole, Flood Waters, Little Miami River, 1851 (Cincinnati Art Museum, Cincinnati, Ohio)
- View of Cincinnati, Ohio From Covington, Kentucky, 1851 (Cincinnati Historical Society)
- The Garden of Eden (after Cole), 1852 (High Museum of Art, Atlanta, Georgia)
- Dream of Arcadia (after Cole), 1852 (Private Collection, New York City)
- Uncle Tom and Little Eva, 1853 (Detroit Institute of Arts, Detroit, Michigan)
- Italianate Landscape, 1855 (California African American Museum, Los Angeles, California)
- Robbing the Eagle's Nest, 1856 (National Museum of African American History and Culture)
- Untitled (Landscape), late 1850s (Princeton University Art Museum)
- Landscape with Rainbow, 1859 (National Museum of American Art, Smithsonian Institution, Washington, D.C.)
- Land of Lotus Eaters, 1861 (Collection of His Royal Majesty, the King of Sweden)
- Faith, 1862 (National Afro-American Museum and Cultural Center, Wilberforce, Ohio)
- Vale of Kashmir, 1863 (Cleveland Museum of Art, Cleveland, Ohio)
- Silver River, North Carolina, 1863 (The Columbia Museum of Art, Columbia, South Carolina)
- Seascape, 1864 (Art Gallery of Ontario, Toronto, Ontario, Canada)
- Lake Beauport, 1864 (Musée national des beaux-arts du Québec, Québec, Canada)
- Lake Saint-Charles, 1864 (Musée national des beaux-arts du Québec, Québec, Canada)
- A Dream of Italy, 1865 (Birmingham Museum of Art, Birmingham, Alabama)
- Cottage Opposite Pass at Ben Lomond, 1866 (Museum of Art, North Carolina Central University, Durham, North Carolina, purchase)
- Mountain Landscape with Cows and Sheep, 1866 (Newark Museum, Newark, New Jersey, purchase)
- Loch Long, Scotland, 1867 (National Museum of American Art, Smithsonian Institution, Washington, D.C.)
- The Caves, 1869 (Amon Carter Museum of American Art)
- Dog's Head Scotland, 1870 (Museum of Fine Arts, Boston, Boston, Massachusetts)

== Gallery ==
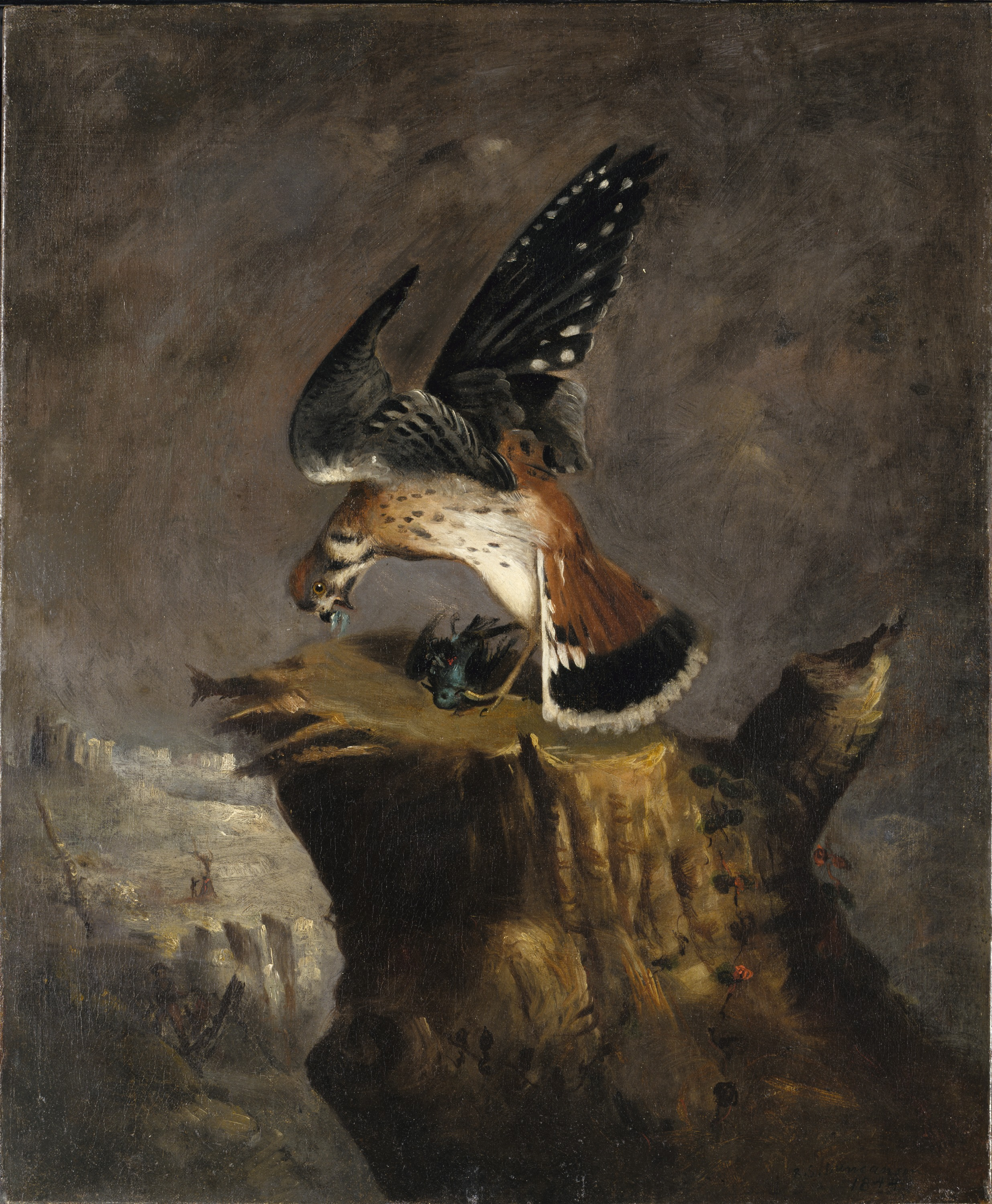
Vulture and Its Prey (1844)

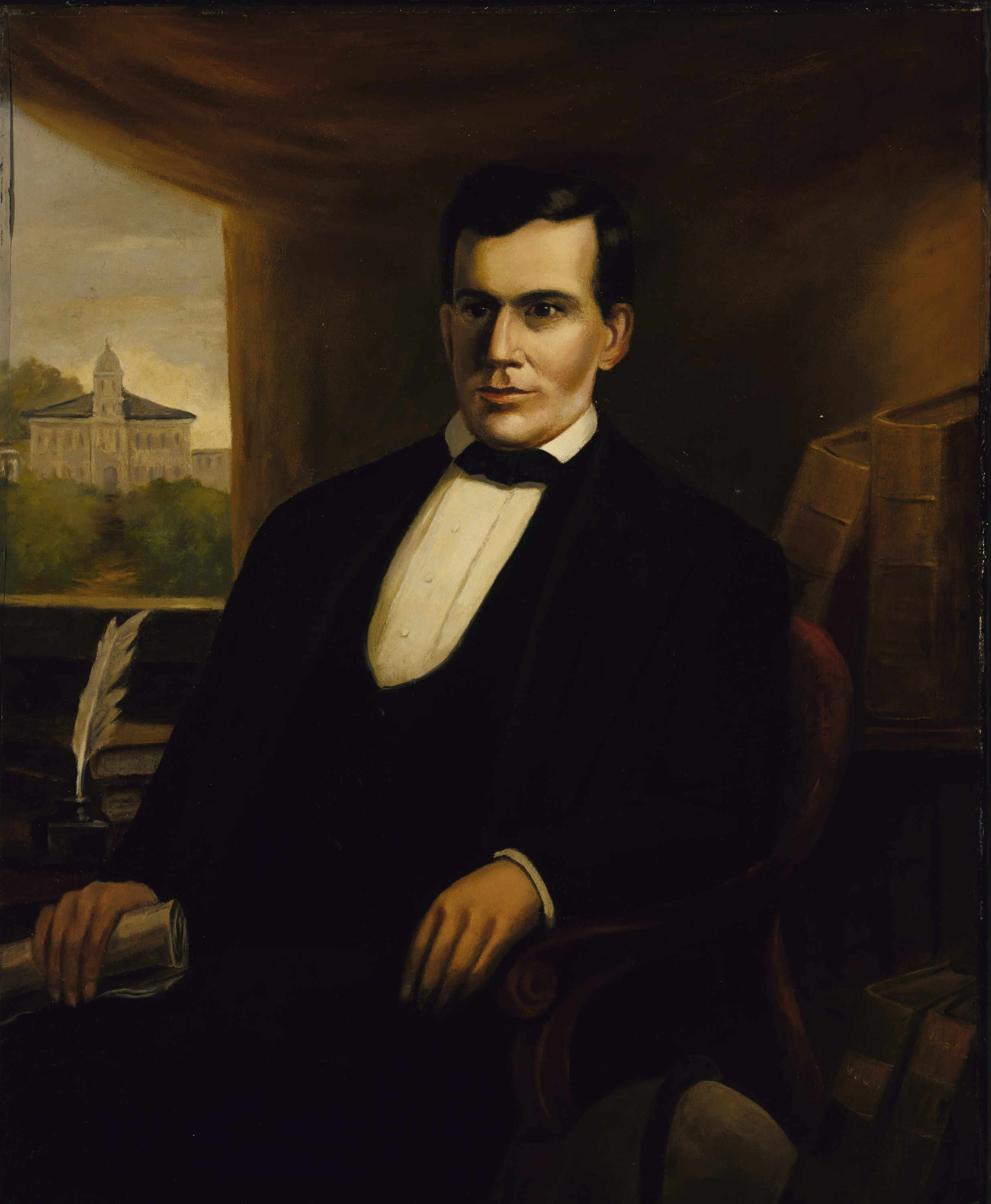
Portrait of Freeman Cary (c. 1856)

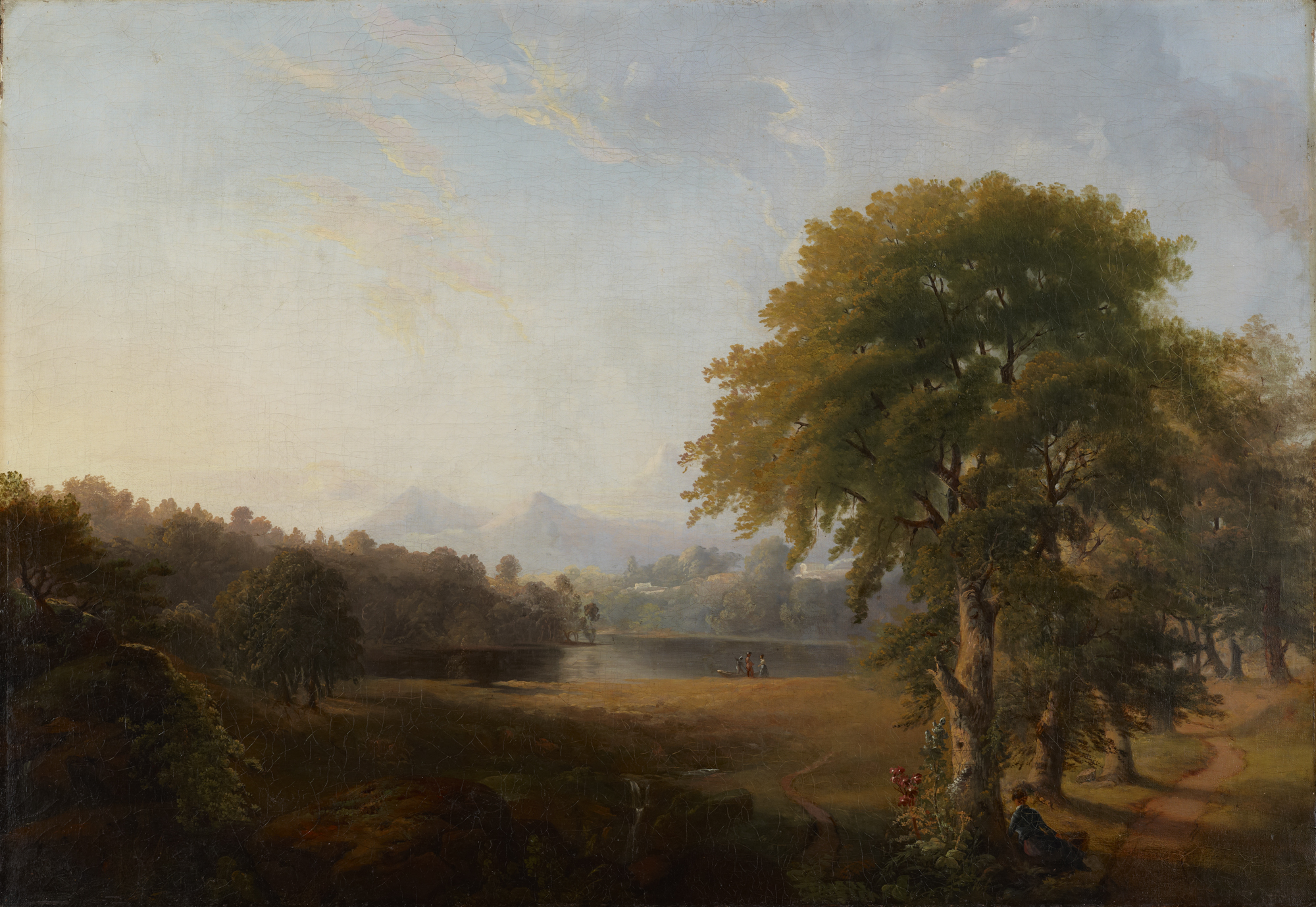
Untitled (Landscape)

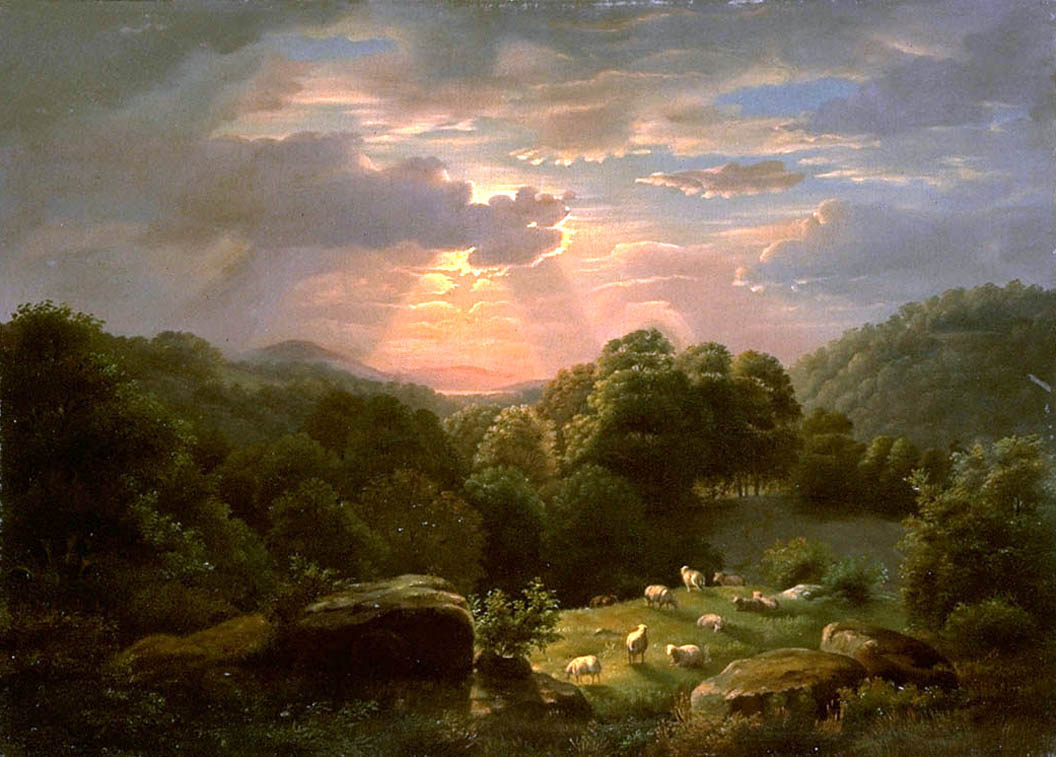
Landscape with Sheep

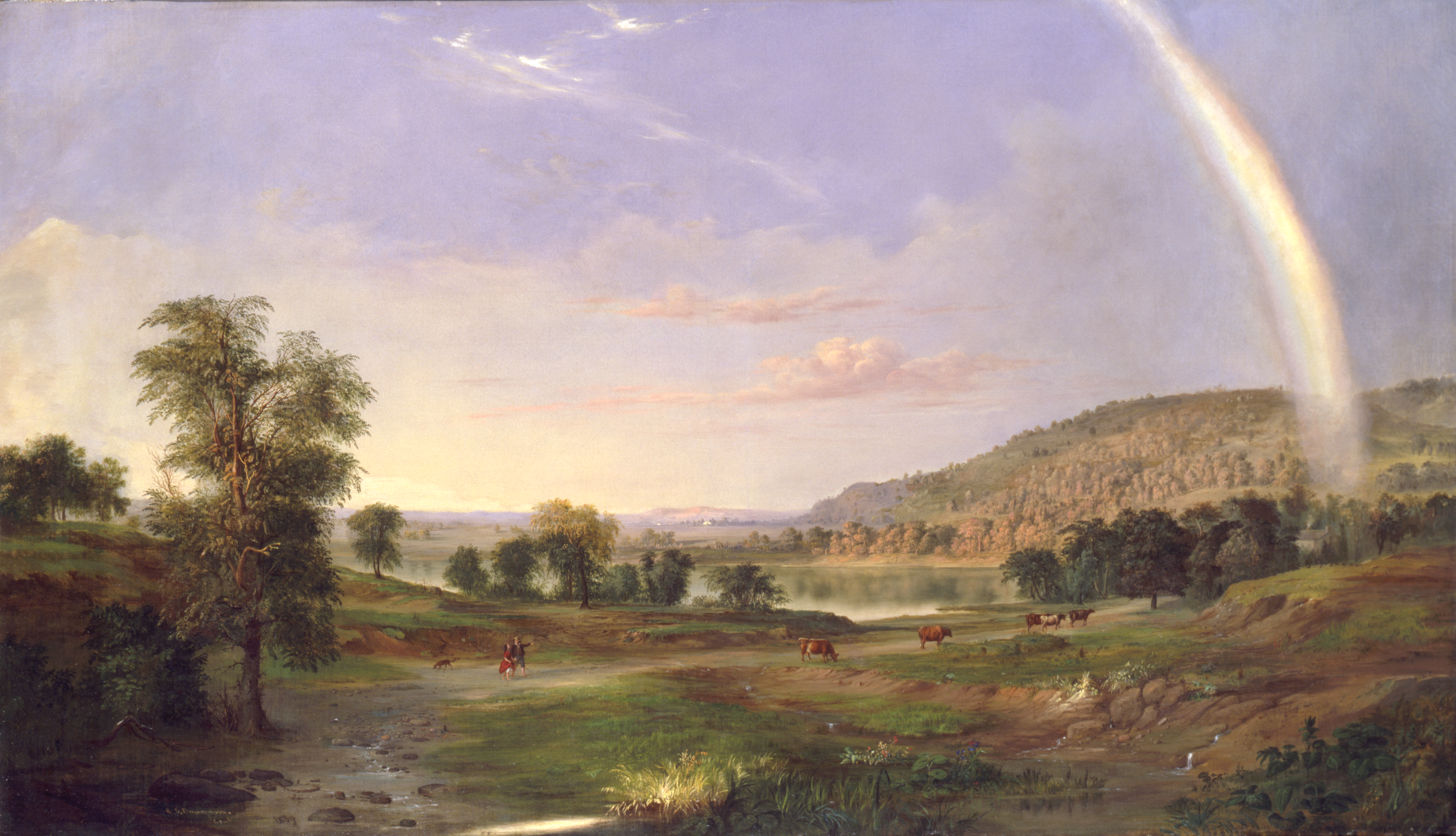
Landscape with Rainbow (1859), Smithsonian American Art Museum

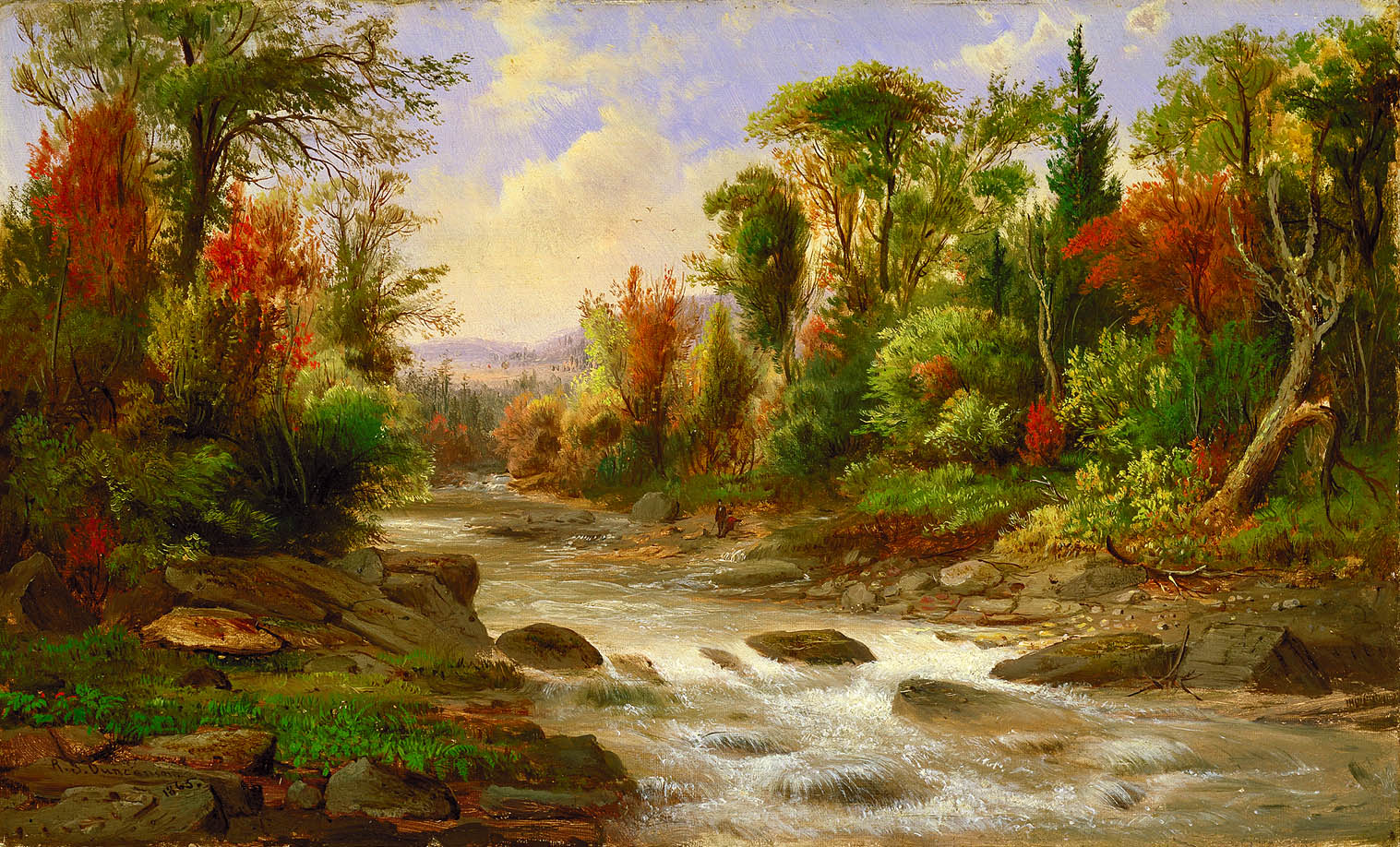
On the St. Annes, East Canada (1863–65)

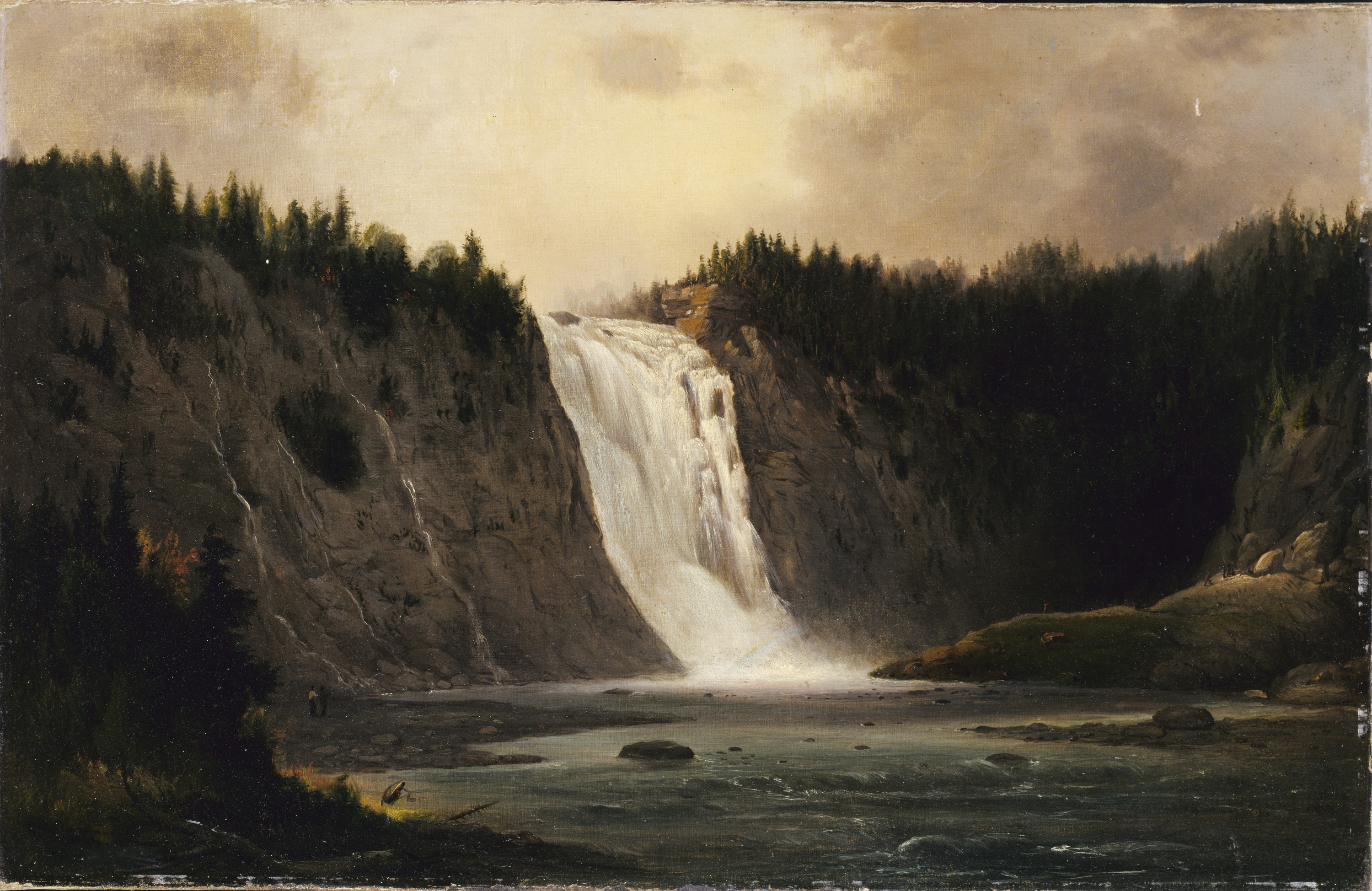
Waterfall on Mont-Morency (1864)

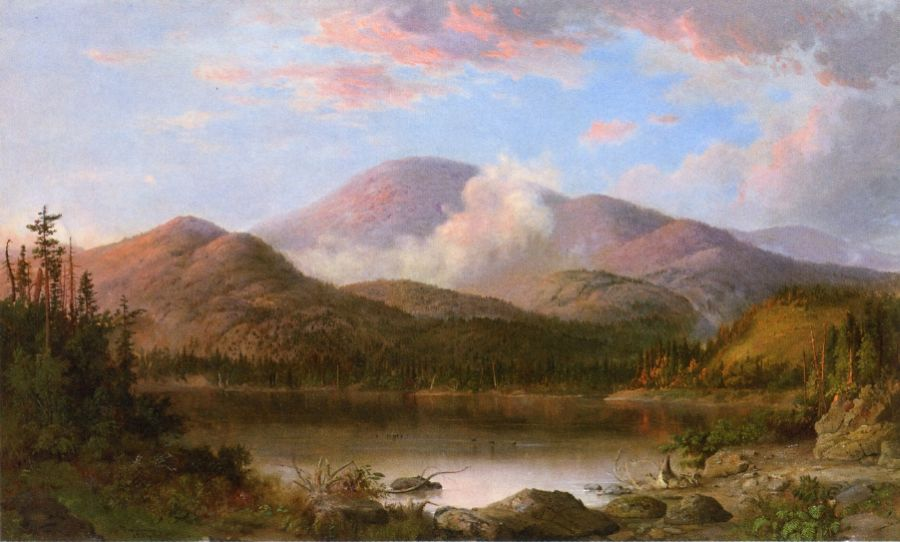
Mount Oxford (1864)

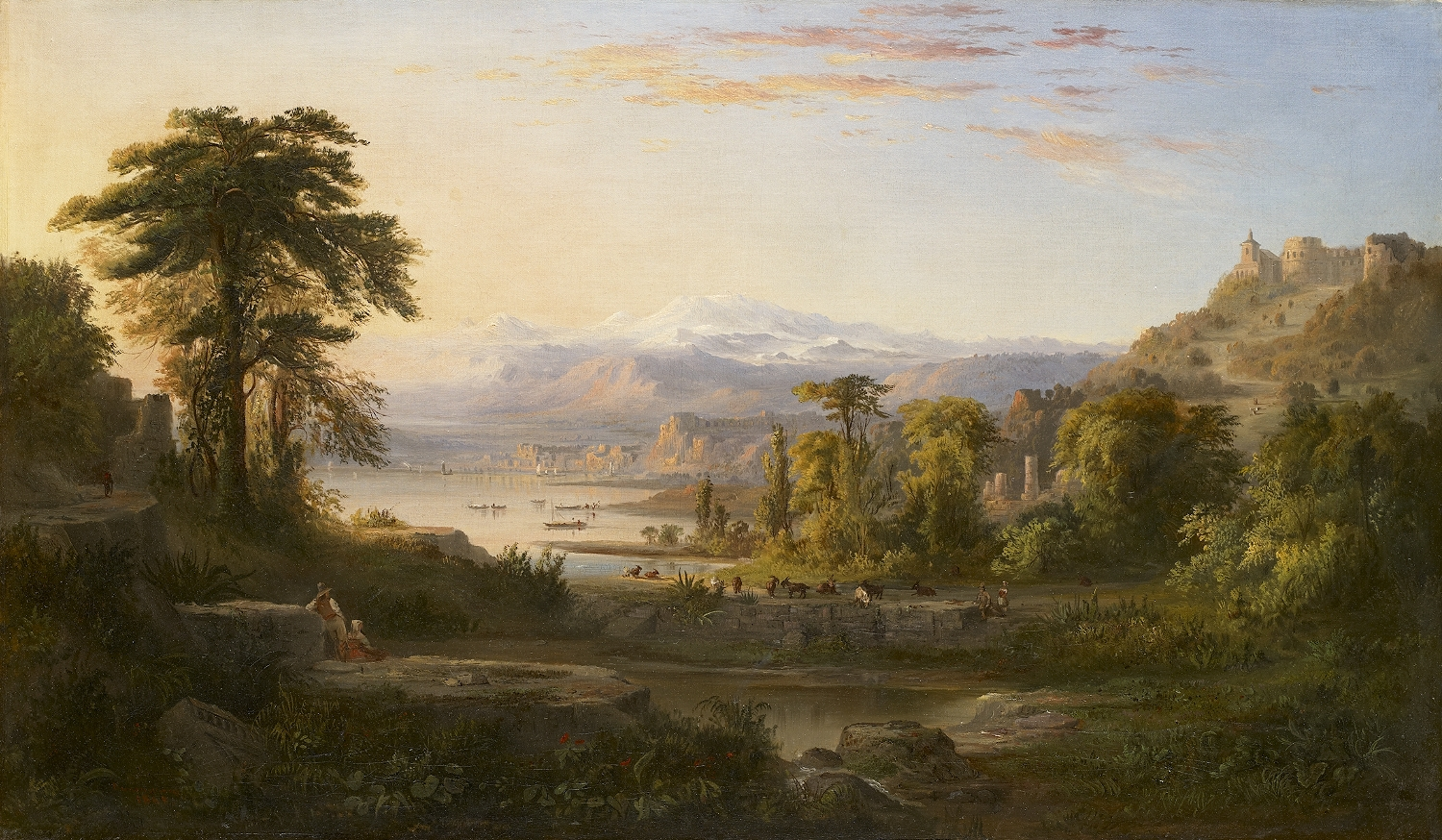
A Dream of Italy (1865)

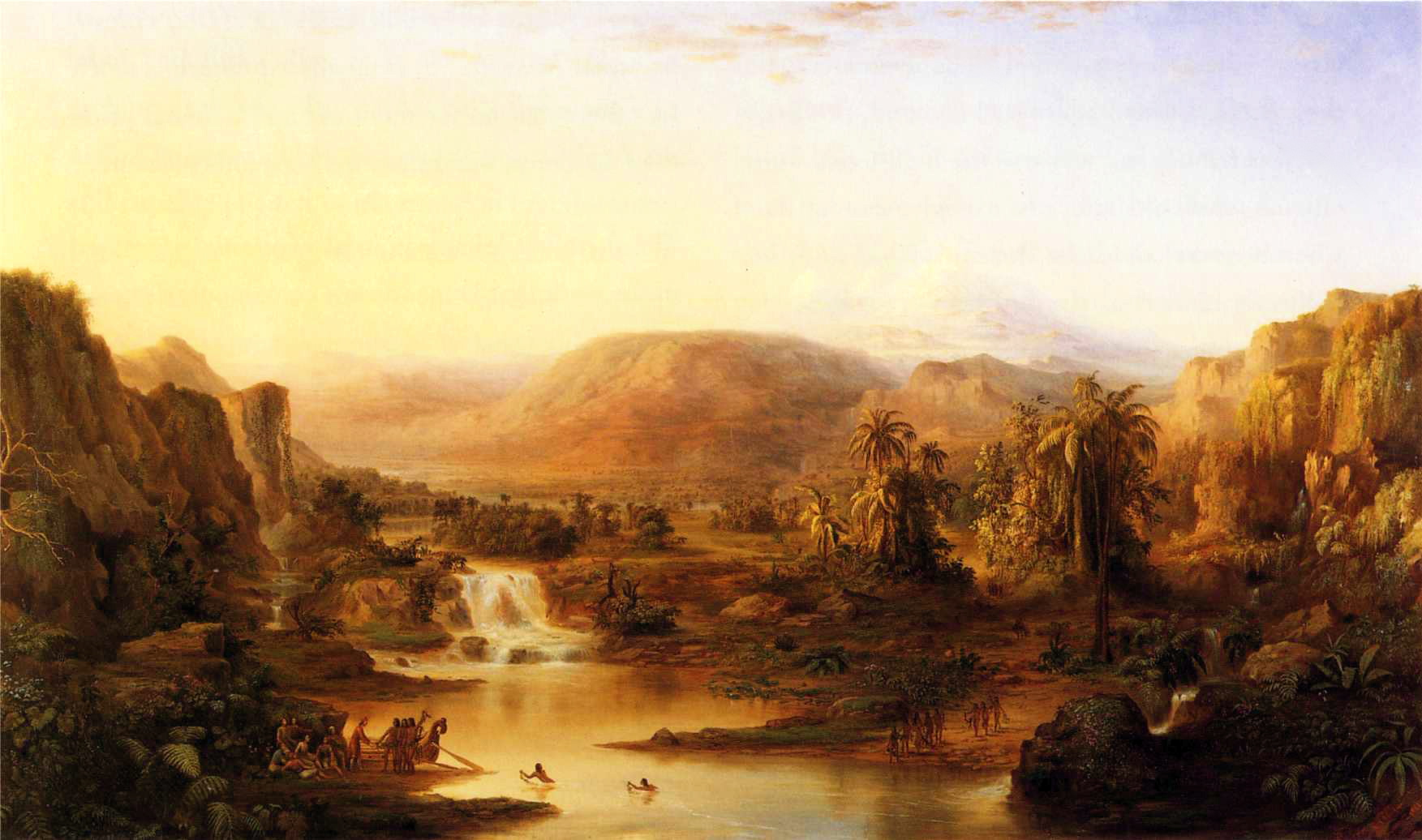
Land of the Lotus Eaters Landscape (1861) Swedish Royal Collection

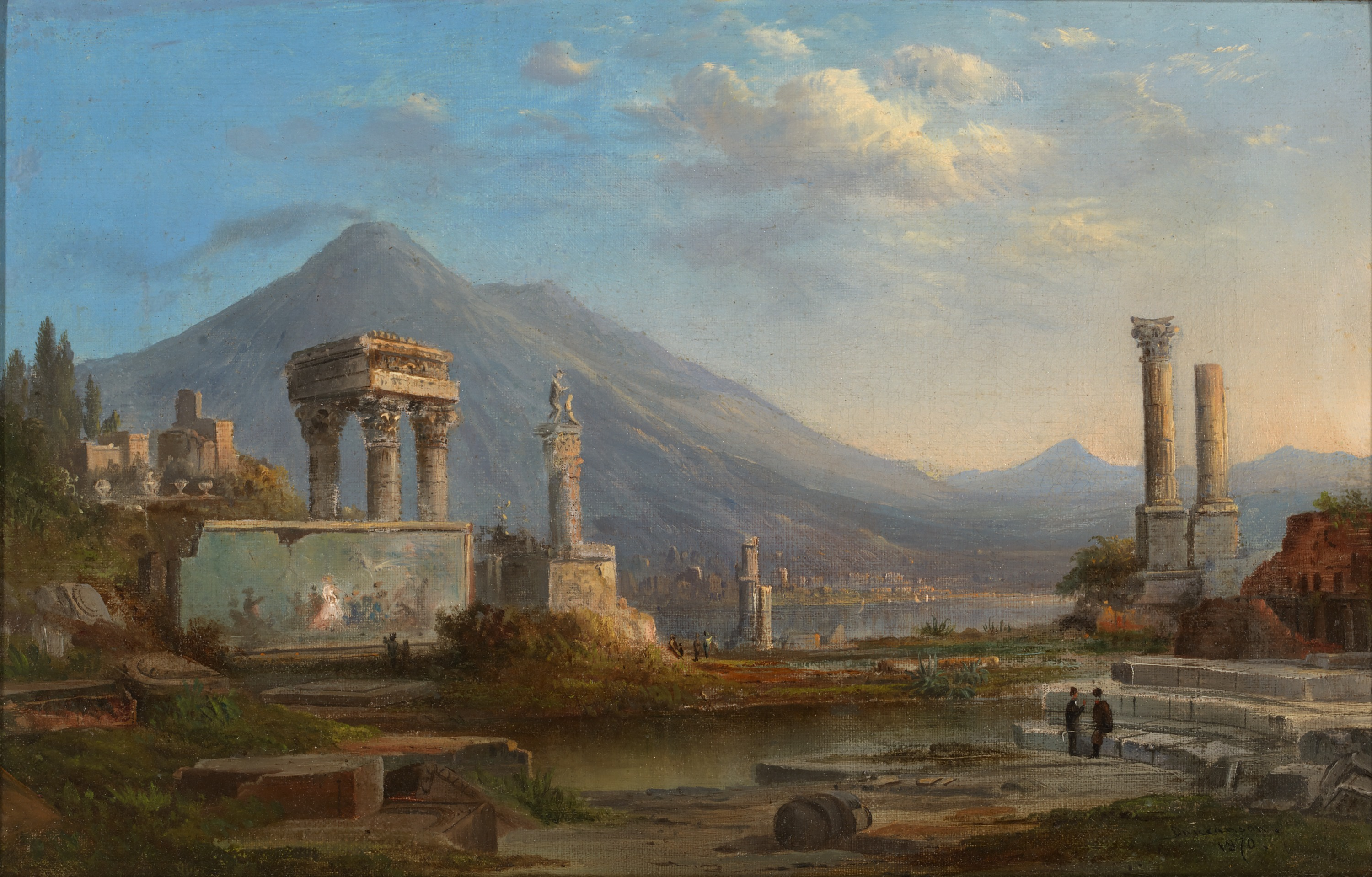
Vesuvius and Pompeii (1870)

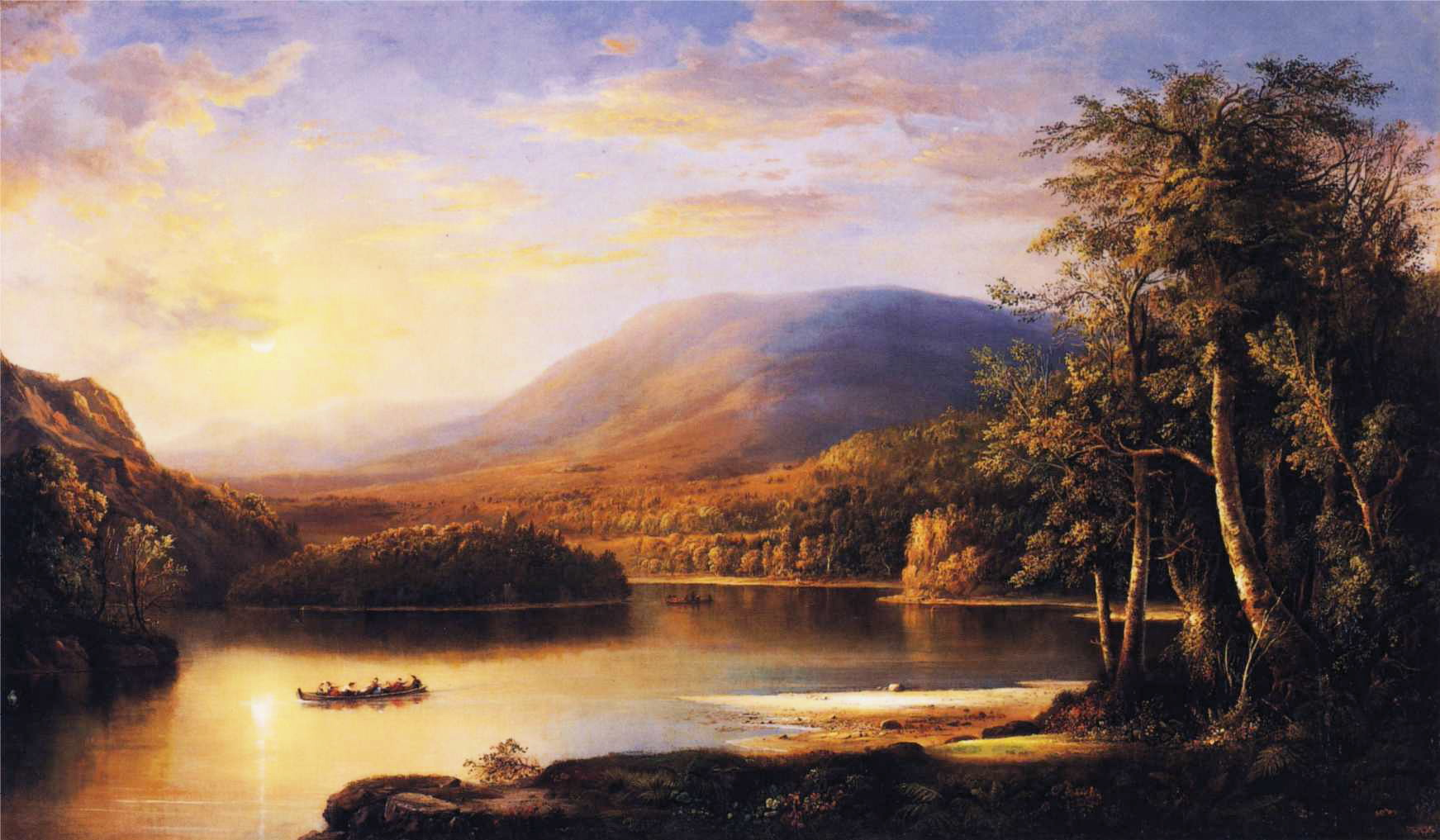
Ellen's Isle, Loch Katrine (1871)

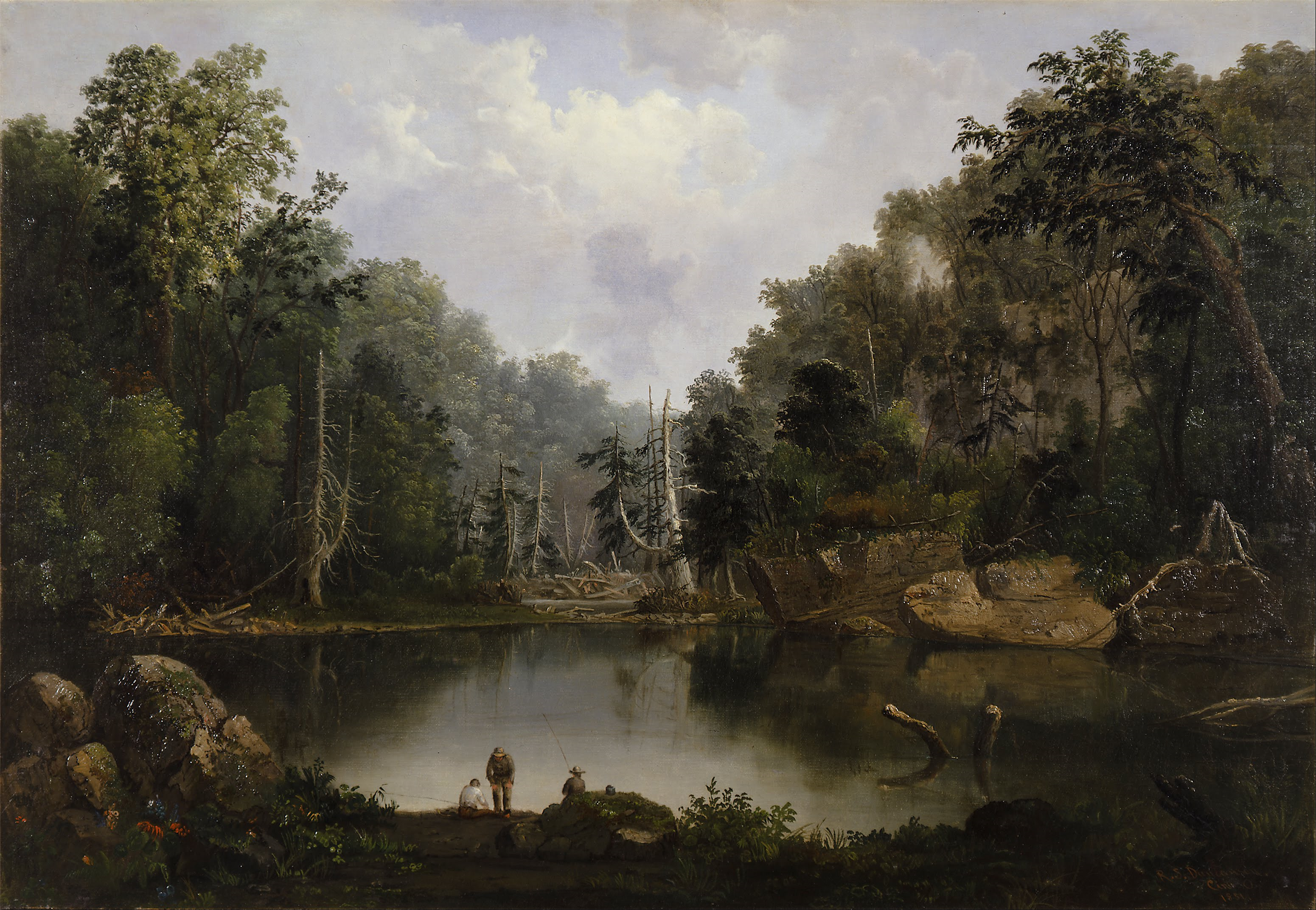
Blue Hole, Flood Waters, Miami River (1851)

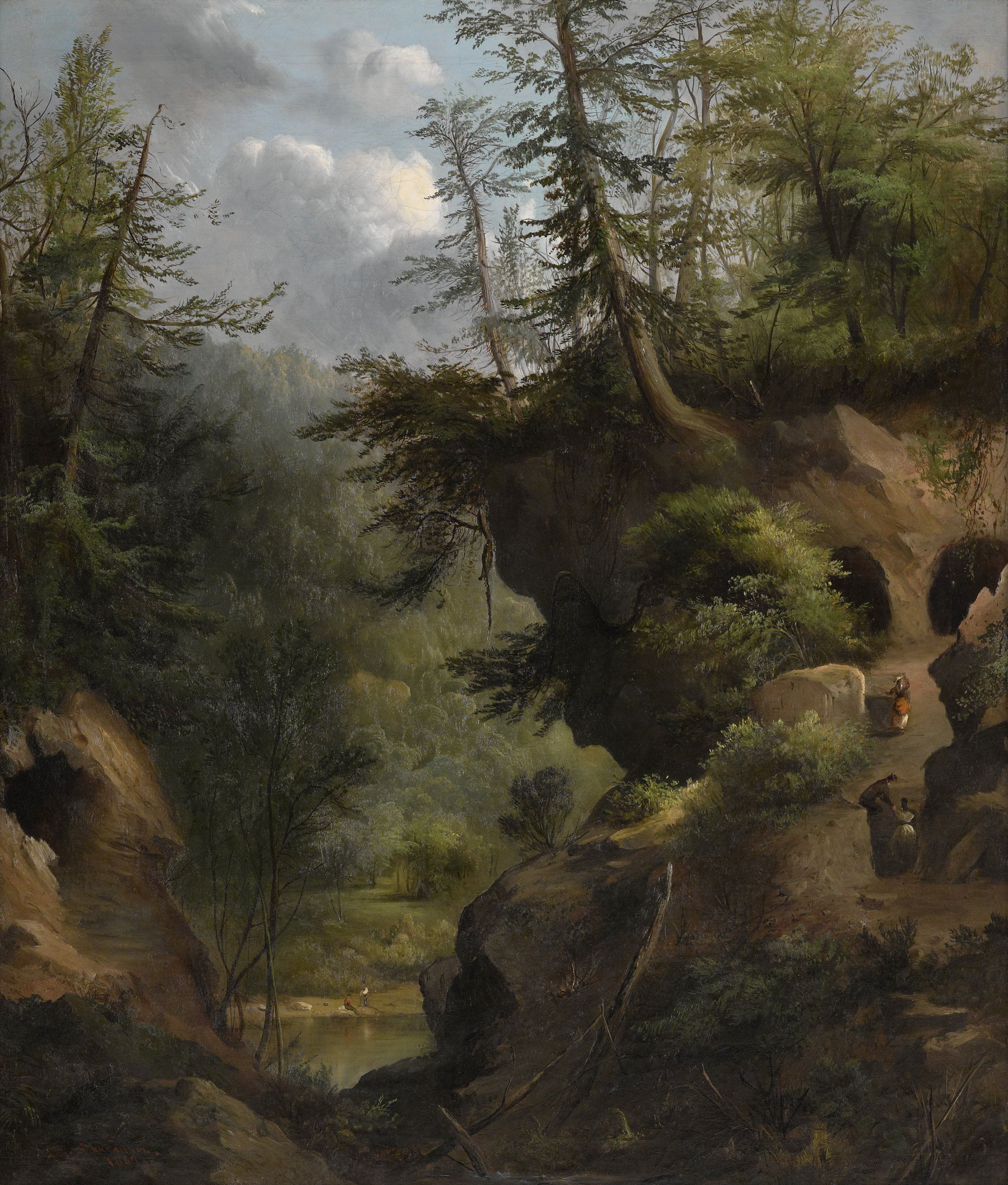
The Caves (1869), Amon Carter Museum of American Art

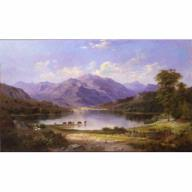
Mountain Landscape with Cows and Sheep, (1866), Newark Museum

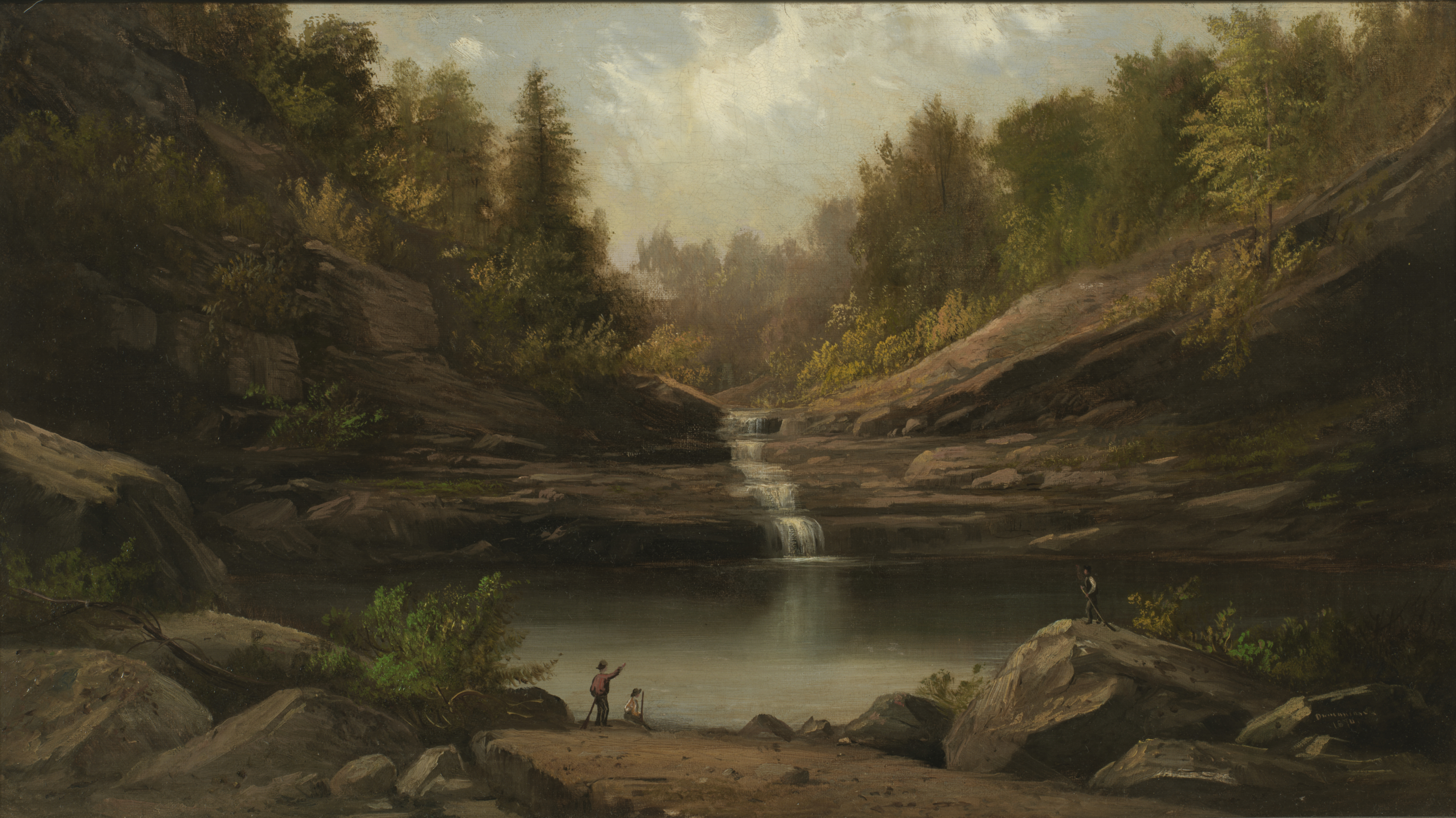
Mountain Pool, 1870, Smithsonian American Art Museum

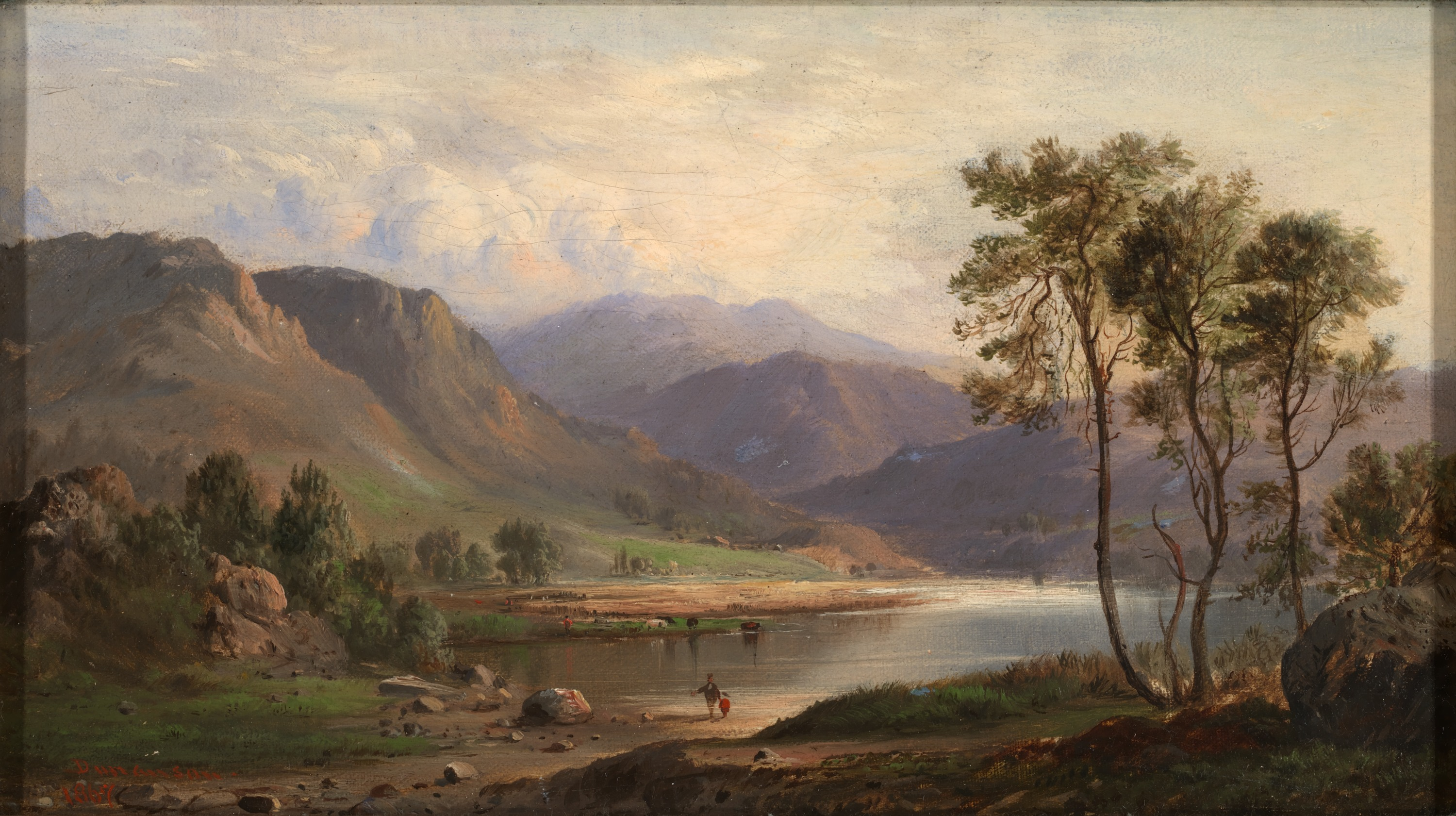
Loch Long, 1867, Smithsonian American Art Museum

== Exhibitions ==
- 1842: Annual Exhibition of Paintings and Statuary, Western Art Union, Cincinnati, Ohio
- 1843: Annual Exhibition of Paintings and Statuary, Western Art Union, Cincinnati, Ohio
- 1864: Art Association of Montreal, Montreal, Canada
- 1865: Dublin Exhibition, Art Association of Montreal, Ireland
- 1871: Western Art Gallery, Detroit, Michigan
- 1943: Balmoral Castle, Scotland, Museum of Modern Art, New York City
- 1953: Denver Art Museum, Denver, Colorado
- 1955: Cincinnati Art Museum, Cincinnati, Ohio
- 1961: Indianapolis Museum of Art Indianapolis, Indiana
- 1967: Howard University Gallery of Art, Washington, D.C.
- 1970: La Jolla Museum of Contemporary Art, La Jolla, California
- 1971: Bowdoin College, Museum of Contemporary Art, Brunswick, Maine
- 1972: Cincinnati Art Museum, Cincinnati, Ohio
- 1972: Museum of Fine Arts, Boston, Boston, Massachusetts
- 1976: Los Angeles County Museum of Art, Los Angeles
- 1979: Detroit Institute of Arts, Detroit, Michigan
- 1983: National Museum of American Art, Washington, D.C.
- 1992: National Museum of American Art, Washington, D.C.
- 1996: Mildred Lane Kemper Art Museum, Washington University in St. Louis, Missouri
- 1999: To Conserve a Legacy - American Art from History, Black Colleges and Universities, Studio Museum in Harlem, New York City
- 2003: Then and Now: Selection of 19-20th Century Art by African American Artists, Detroit Institute of Arts, Detroit, Michigan
- 2009: Cincinnati Art Museum, Cincinnati, Ohio
- 2023-2024: J. P. Ball and Robert S. Duncanson: An African American Artistic Collaboration, Smithsonian American Art Museum
- 2026-2027: Robert Duncanson: Landscapes to Freedom, Redwood Library and Atheneum, Newport, Rhode Island. July 2, 2026- January 31, 2027

== See also ==
- List of Hudson River School artists
- List of African-American visual artists
