= William Louis Sonntag =

American painter

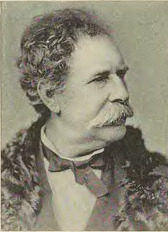
- Born: March 2, 1822; Pennsylvania
- Died: January 22, 1900 (aged 77); New York City

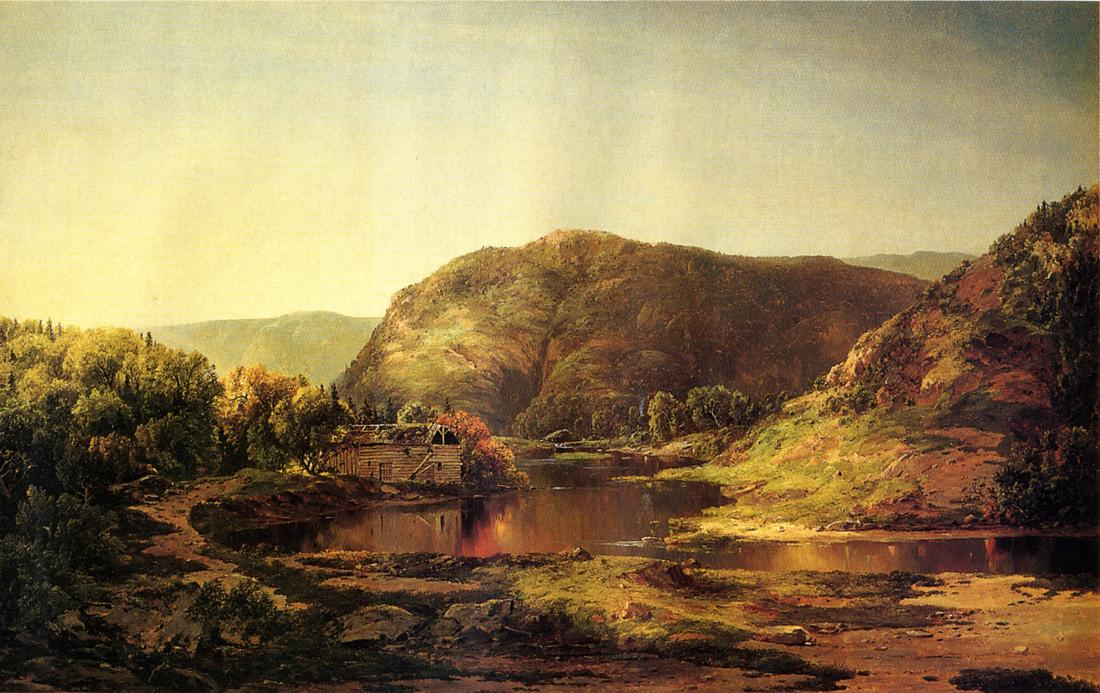
Shenandoah Valley, oil on canvas, William Louis Sonntag Sr., 1859–1860. Virginia Historical Society

William Louis Sonntag Sr. (1822–1900) was an American landscape painter.

== Life and work ==
Born near Pittsburgh, Pennsylvania in 1822, he traveled to Cincinnati, Ohio, at the age of 21 and perfected his technique. Becoming an established and highly regarded landscape artist, he began making trips to Florence, Italy in 1853. Several of these trips were made with his friend Robert Seldon Duncanson.

On October 31, 1851, he married Mary A. Cowdell in Hamilton County, Ohio.

In 1856, Sonntag permanently moved to New York to become a leading painter of Romantic landscapes of several scenes from his travels in Italy. Sonntag was a member of the group known as the Hudson River School. Some of his paintings go beyond the movement to a grandiose expression of Manifest Destiny.

There is strong evidence that several of Sonntag's pieces were scenes he had seen from photographs only. Grand Canyon, Yellowstone River, Wyoming, for example, is a landscape that Sonntag never traveled to. It is most likely based on a photograph taken by Frank Jay Haynes of the canyon in 1885.

His son, William Louis Sonntag Jr. (1869–1898), was also a painter and an illustrator. Theodore Dreiser wrote about his friendship with him in "W.L.S." and elsewhere.

== Gallery ==
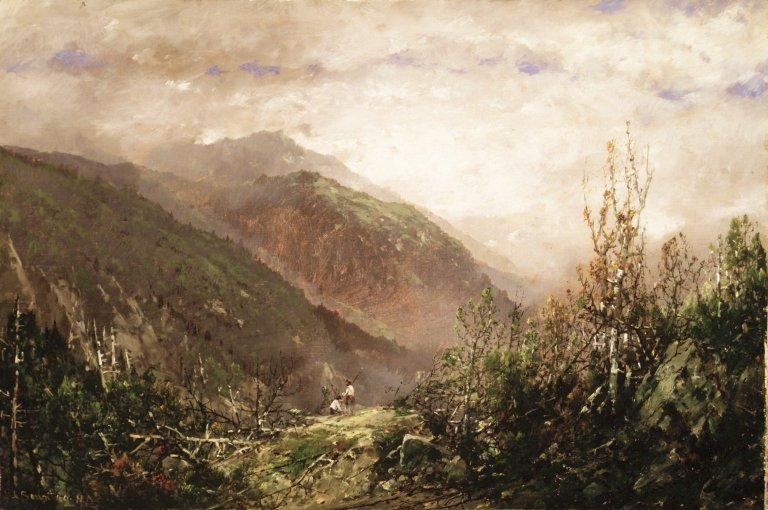
Scene in the White Mountains,
Brooklyn Museum

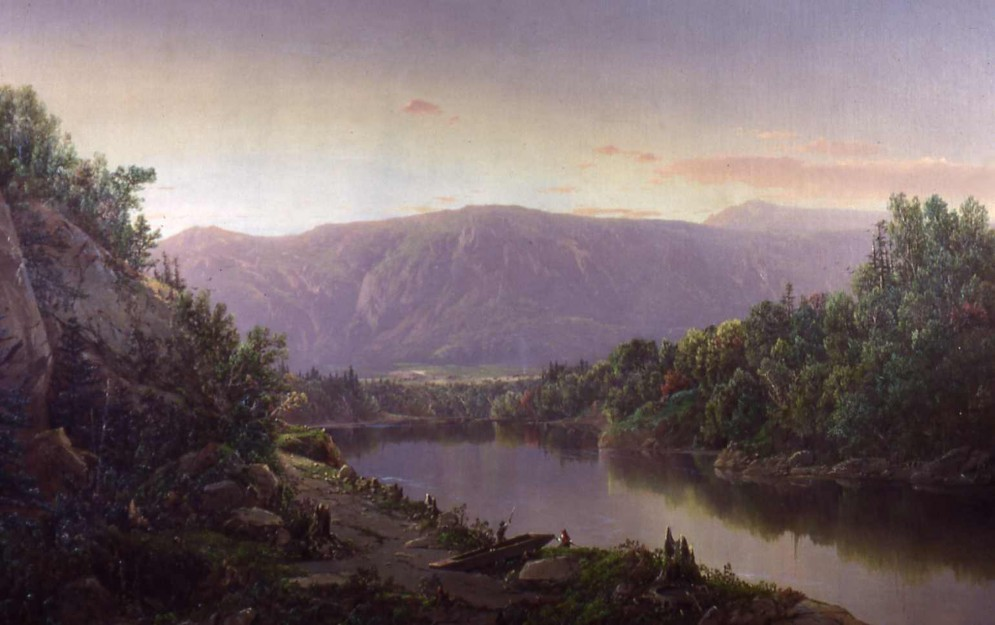
On the Potomac, Walters Art Museum

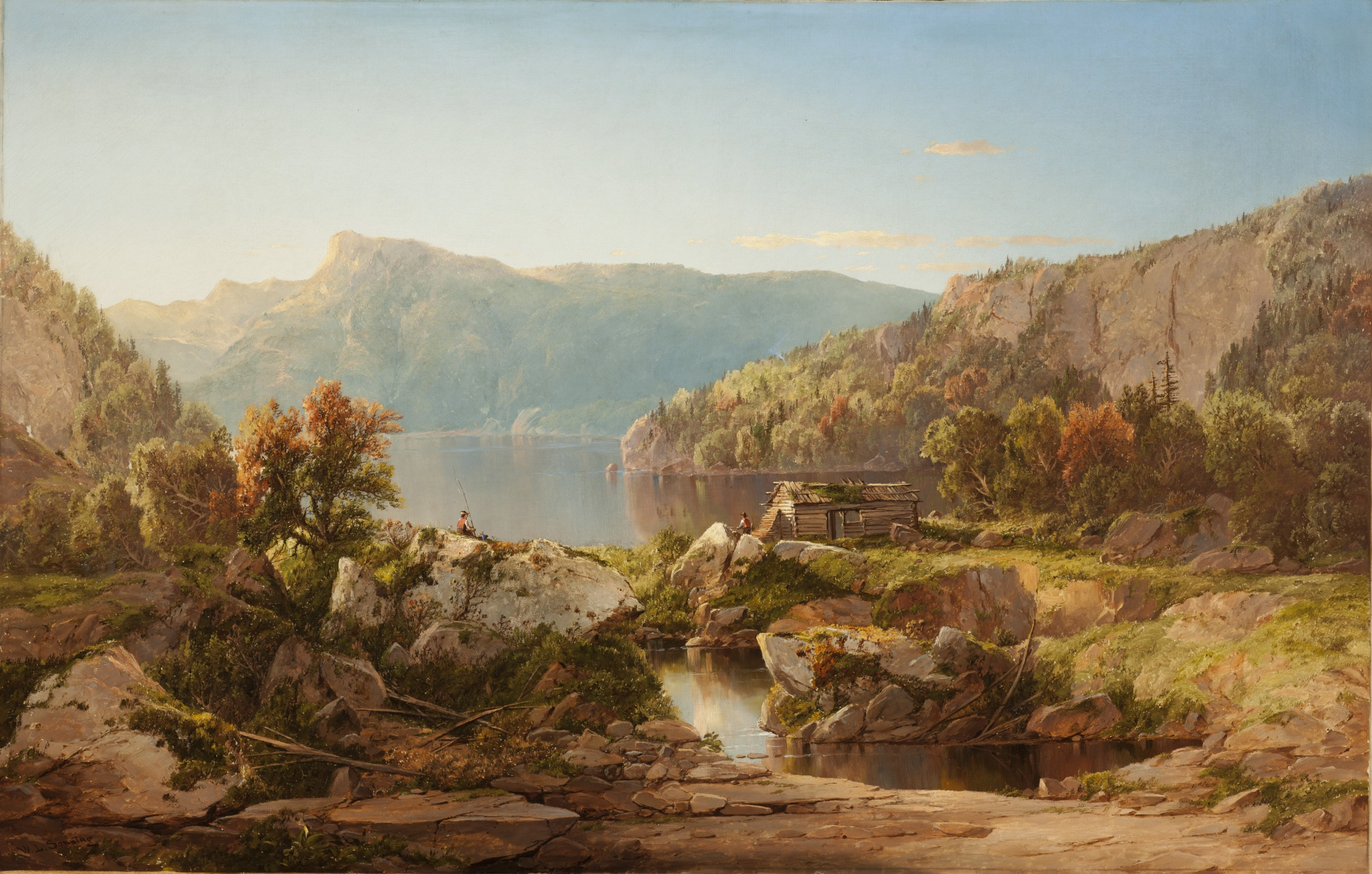
Autumn Morning on the Potomac, LACMA
