= Cinque Gallery =

Art gallery in New York

The Cinque Gallery
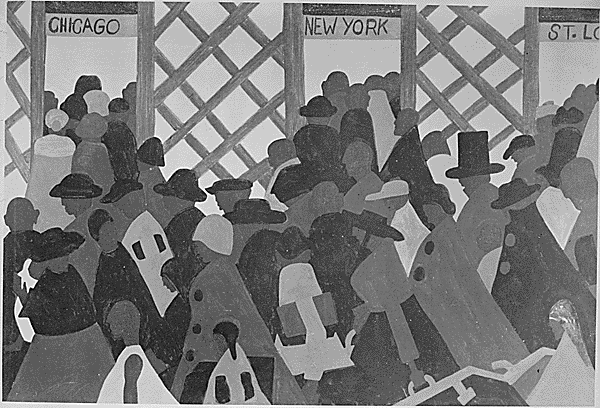
- Painter Jacob Lawrence, known for his 60-panel Migration Series, exhibited at Cinque. Image depicts panel 1.
- Predecessor: The Spiral group
- Formation: 1969; 57 years ago
- Founder: Romare Bearden, Ernest Crichlow, and Norman Lewis
- Dissolved: 2004; 22 years ago
- Type: Art gallery
- Purpose: To provide a place where the works of unknown, and neglected artists of talent … — primarily Black artists — would not only be shown but nurtured and developed.
- Headquarters: Downtown, New York City (various locales)
- Services: Solo, group and traveling exhibitions. Lectures, talks, interviews and artists-in-residence.
- Executive Director: Ruth M. Jett
- Administrative Director: Karen Hatcher
- Volunteers: Artist-run volunteers
- Website: www.aaa.si.edu/exhibitions/expanding-the-legacy-new-collections-on-african-american-art/cinque-gallery-records

The Cinque Gallery (1969–2004) was an art gallery in New York City co-founded by artists Romare Bearden, Ernest Crichlow, and Norman Lewis as an outgrowth of the Black power movement to "provide a place where the works of unknown, and neglected artists of talent …" — primarily Black artists — "would not only be shown but nurtured and developed". "Relying on a series of volunteers, Cinque hosted solo, group, and touring exhibitions," and sponsored an artist-in-residence program, which was inaugurated with collagist Nanette Carter.

Over its 35-year history, the gallery showcased both figurative and abstract art by some 450 artists of color, and was praised for its range. Many of the artists who exhibited there are among the most celebrated and significant Black artists in the United States. They include figurative painter Jacob Lawrence, painter Michael S Kendall, abstract painter Frank Bowling OBE RA, Caldecott-winning illustrator Tom Feelings, animator Edward H. Love, sculptor Valerie Maynard, muralist Hale Woodruff, National Medal of Arts winner Jack Whitten, and master printmaker Robert Blackburn, among others.

An artist-run space, the Cinque played a significant role in the Black Arts Movement, but was also known for exhibiting marginalized artists of all kinds, including Asian and Hispanic artists.

== History ==
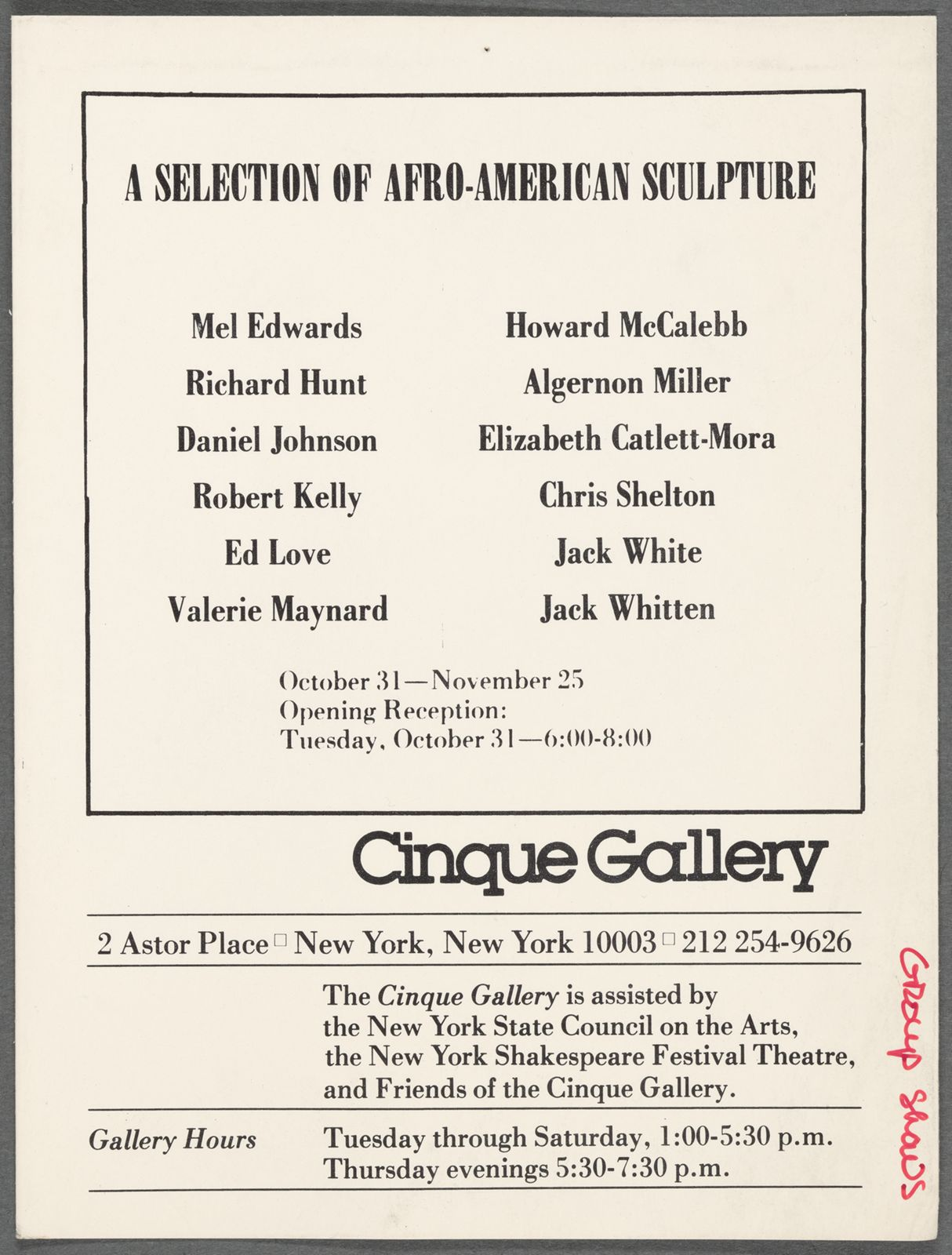
Exhibition Card, NYC, 1978

The gallery's foundation was propelled by New York City's Metropolitan Museum of Art's "infamous 1969 show Harlem on My Mind, which consisted of 'documentary photographs,'" but failed to include any Black fine artists. Its name was inspired by Sengbe Pieh, aka Joseph Cinqué, the leader of the 1839 rebellion on the Spanish slave ship La Amistad.

But the gallery was also an "outgrowth of the Spiral group, which met regularly from 1963 to 1965 to explore the question, "What is Black art?" That group, which mounted a single exhibition and then disbanded, included two of Cinque's co-founders (Bearden and Lewis), as well as artists Hale Woodruff, Charles Alston, Felrath Hines, and Richard Mayhew. The late '60s were characterized by a push for cultural and economic autonomy throughout New York City's arts in that era, several "New York institutions and collectives, such as the Brooklyn Museum Community Gallery and the Studio Museum in Harlem ... and the Black Emergency Cultural Coalition" emerged within a few years of each other. By the 1980s, however, Administrative Director Karen Hatcher and co-founder Ernest Crichlow emphasized the practicality of their mission: "[T]he unsung purpose of the gallery [was] to provide administrative, political, and social knowledge to young Blacks who wished to work in the arts." The gallery closed in 2004.

In 2019, the gallery's 50th anniversary was organized by the Romare Beardon Foundation, and celebrated at the Harlem School of the Arts. In 2021, the Art Students League of New York celebrated the gallery's legacy at the League, with the exhibition Creating Community: Cinque Gallery Artists, featuring dozens of artists with exhibition histories at the Cinque. Susan Stedman, the exhibition's guest curator, has been working on an oral history of the gallery since 2017, building on the records held by the Smithsonian's Archives of American Art.

== Artists ==
(Key figures are listed below, but the list is not comprehensive.)

- Michael S Kendall (painter)
- Charles Alston
- Emma Amos
- Benny Andrews
- Romare Bearden
- Dawoud Bey
- Camille Billops
- Robert Blackburn
- Betty Blayton
- Frank Bowling
- Vivian Browne
- Nanette Carter
- Elizabeth Catlett
- Ed Clark
- Ernest Crichlow
- Melvin Edwards
- Tom Feelings
- Sam Gilliam
- Ray Grist
- Cynthia Hawkins
- Robin Holder
- Richard Hunt
- Bill Hutson
- Mohammad Omer Khalil
- Hughie Lee-Smith
- Norman Lewis
- Daniel LaRue Johnson
- Robert Kelly
- Wifredo Lam
- Jacob Lawrence
- Hughie Lee-Smith
- Ed Love
- Whitfield Lovell
- Alvin D. Loving
- Valerie Maynard
- Richard Mayhew
- Howard McCalebb
- Algernon Miller
- Norma Morgan
- Otto Neals
- Ademola Olugebefola
- Debra Priestly
- Mavis Pusey
- Faith Ringgold
- Chris Shelton
- Ann Tanksley
- Mildred Thompson
- Charles W. White
- Jack White (sculptor)
- Jack Whitten
- Benjamin Leroy Wigfall
- Frank Wimberley
- Hale Woodruff

== See also ==
- African-American art
- Black Arts Movement
- Harlem Renaissance
- List of American artists before 1900
- List of American artists 1900 and after
- List of African-American visual artists
- The Quilts of Gees Bend
- Studio Museum of Harlem

== Related books ==
- Cahan, S. E. (2016). Mounting Frustration: The Art Museum in the Age of Black Power. Durham, NC: Duke University Press. 360 pages. ISBN 978-0-8223-7145-8 doi:10.2307/j.ctv11688vt
