= James E. Lewis =

African-American artist, art historian, curator, and professor

- Born: August 4, 1923; Phenix, Virginia
- Died: August 9, 1997 (aged 74); Baltimore, Maryland
- Education: Temple University, Philadelphia College of Art
- Known for: James E. Lewis Museum of Art (JELMA)
- Notable work: Frederick Douglass; Negro Soldier
- Movement: Black Arts Movement, abstract expressionism

James Edward Lewis (August 4, 1923 – August 9, 1997) was an African-American artist, art collector, professor, and curator in the city of Baltimore. He is best known for his role as the leading force for the creation of the James E. Lewis Museum of Art, an institution of the HBCU Morgan State University. His work as the chairman of the Morgan Art Department from 1950 to 1986 allowed for the museum to amass a large collection of more than 3,000 works, predominantly of African and African diasporan art. In addition, he is also well known for his role as an interdisciplinary artist, primarily focused on sculpture, though also having notable examples of lithography and illustration. His artistic style throughout the years has developed from an earlier focus on African-American history and historical figures, for which he is most notable as an artist, to a more contemporary style of African-inspired abstract expressionism.

== Early and personal life ==
James E. Lewis was born in rural Phenix, Virginia on August 4, 1923 to James T. Lewis and Pearlean Harvey. Lewis' parents were both sharecroppers. Shortly after his birth, his father moved to Baltimore for increased job opportunities; James E. was subsequently raised by his mother until the family was reunited in 1925. They lived for a short time with distant relatives until moving to a four-bedroom house on 1024 North Durham Street in East Baltimore, a predominantly African-American lower-class neighborhood close to Johns Hopkins Hospital. Lewis' primary school, PS 101, was the only public school in East Baltimore that served black children. Lewis grew up in a church-going family, his parents both active members of the Faith Baptist Church, devoting the entirety of their Sundays to church activities. His parents worked a variety of different jobs throughout his youth: his father working as a stevedore for a shipping company, a mechanic, a custodian, a mailroom handler, and an elevator operator. His mother worked as both a clerk at a drugstore and a laundress for a private family.

Lewis' primary exposure to the arts came from Dr. Leon Winslow, a faculty member at PS 101 who Lewis saw as "providing encouragement and art materials to those who wanted and needed it." In fifth grade, Lewis transferred to PS 102. Here, he was able to receive specialized Art Education in Ms. William's class under the guidance of Winslow. He was considered a standout pupil at PS 102 as a result of his introduction to the connection between the arts and the other studies. His time spent in Ms. Pauline Wharton's class allowed him to experiment with singing, for which he was considered a talented singer. His involvement in this class challenged his earlier belief that singing was not a masculine artistic pursuit. He was able to study both European classics and negro spirituals, which was one of his earliest introductions to arts specific to American black culture. Under Ms. Wharton's direction, he was also involved in many different musical performances, including some works of the Works Progress Administration's Federal Theatre Project. Lewis attended Paul Laurence Dunbar High School, where his love of the arts was heightened through his industrial art class with Lee Davis, who instilled in him a care for fine craftsmanship. At age sixteen, Lewis had won a citywide poster design contest, and later had the work displayed at the Enoch Pratt Free Library. He produced his first sculpture at age 17 out of earthen clay from the East Monument Street fairgrounds. He was personally very close with the school faculty, often going over to Davis' house to listen to jazz music or visiting Dr. Winslow and his children. The connection he had with the Winslow family solidified his interest in pursuing fine art after high school. By age 19, he had produced five completed portrait busts. While still in high school, Lewis had been awarded a Carnegie Institute grant to study at the Maryland Institute College of Art, but the school was highly segregated at the time and thus he was prohibited from attending. Luckily, a compromise was made with the school to allow an advanced student, American artist Charles Cross, to tutor him in private sessions. He graduated from Dunbar High with the highest average in the arts.

Pearlean was supportive of her son's desire to pursue a career in the arts, but her husband felt the opposite, believing that his son should make an honest living through manual labor. As a result, James E. Lewis opted to work at the Baltimore Calvert distillery during the summer following graduation, beginning on the 30th of June of that year. Having just graduated and now a young adult, Lewis registered for the Selective Service System. During this time, a legal loophole was created that allowed for African-Americans in Maryland to study at any college of their choice with tuition, travel, and room and board covered by the state, so long as they intended to study a field that had no current representation in any of the black schools they were allowed to attend. Lewis, seeing this law as a form of "poetic justice", decided to apply to study fine art at Philadelphia College of Art, now called the University of the Arts. Lewis studied for a year at PCA before receiving a letter in the mail from the United States Armed Forces stating that he had been drafted into World War II.

Lewis had been drafted into the United States Navy, but soon after joined the United States Marine Corps due to a new policy that allowed for black recruits, something which he saw as both progress and a personal challenge. He was stationed at Camp Lejeune in Jacksonville, North Carolina, traveling there with his fellow Marines in a segregated train car. At the camp, the segregation further continued, with the black soldiers living in makeshift huts and their white counterparts living in brick buildings. In 1943, he received notice of his father's death and returned home for the funeral. Shortly after the services, he returned to camp, something which he regretted in hindsight after finding out he could have been discharged, as he was his mother's sole source of financial support. He returned to discover that many of his unit members had been shipped out to the front lines in the Pacific. He heard stories of black soldiers being sent out with no weapons and so he had himself transferred to the 51st Defense Battalion, the first black fighting unit of the Marine Corp. Given the prevalence of racial discrimination in the United States military and the skill of the battalion, Lewis claimed that they were shipped out to Easter Island to keep them away from the action and preserve the image of the white Marines. He served a short stint in gunnery and intelligence before leaving the military in 1946.

James E. Lewis returned to Philadelphia College of Art and received a Bachelor of Fine Arts in 1949. During this time, he met and married his wife, Jacqueline Lucille Adams, at Saint Cyprian's Episcopal Church in the Elmwood neighborhood of Philadelphia on June 8, 1946. Lewis planned on having a career solely in illustration, but realized that the field was not welcoming to African-Americans. The Philadelphia College of Art offered him a position as a drawing instructor, and so he worked there for a short time. He received an offer to teach at Morgan State University not long after this but refused the position, instead choosing to use the G.I. Bill to stay in Philadelphia and attend the Tyler School of Art at Temple University. He received his Master of Fine Arts from Temple in 1950. After graduating, he was offered a teaching position at Jackson State Teachers' College and accepted. Three days before his planned arrival in Jackson, Mississippi, he received a call from Martin David Jenkins with another offer to teach at Morgan State. Lewis changed his mind and took the Morgan position, settling back in Baltimore with his wife and son, James.

Lewis was also a personal collector of art. He once cancelled a vacation because he ended up spending all the funds on purchasing a Henry Ossawa Tanner work in New York. He was also known to have collected the works of his students, buying them to inspire them to keep producing art.

He was known to have spoken with Martin Luther King Jr. before King's death. Lewis was a strong supporter of placing a bust in the United States Capitol, and was one of the first to lobby for it.

Lewis and Adams had two children together, Cathleen Susan Lewis (born March 17, 1958) and James Edward Lewis Jr. (born October 16, 1949).

James E. Lewis died of stroke complications on August 9, 1997, at Genesis Nursing Home in Baltimore. He was 74 years old.

== Academic career ==
=== Morgan State educator ===
At the start of his career, Lewis was part of a three-person art department, including himself, Charles Stallings, and Samella Lewis. Samella Lewis was on leave at the start of his position, and she left shortly after his promotion to chairman at the end of the year. He chose to restructure the department in 1951 and created the program that grants bachelor's degrees in art education. Lewis' role as an art collector on behalf of Morgan State began in 1952 with the purchase of five works of African art for $595. Sometime in the early 1950s, Lewis also introduced the first courses on African and African-American art. In 1954, he was awarded the Ford Foundation Fellowship to study as a fellow at various institutions. He was a fellow at Temple University and Syracuse University in 1954 and Yale University in 1955. It was during his time at Yale that he was working directly under the great Bauhaus artist Josef Albers, who "shook up" what Lewis previously knew about art. It was Albers who inspired Lewis to seek motifs from traditional African art for his own work. Around this time, Lewis received a letter from his former mentor, Charles Cross, who sought a position in the department, though Cross didn't end up working there.

Lewis, on behalf of Morgan State University, was awarded a $5,000 grant from the American Federation of Arts to add works to the university's collection, the first award the arts department had received for its gallery. Shortly after they were purchased, however, three works were stolen from the collection while Lewis was working to find a permanent location to display them. In 1964, he visited galleries in New York City, one of which was the Hirschl & Adler Galleries, which later gifted the museum thirty-five works of European and American importance. Lewis was working on curating an exhibition at Morgan's art galleries at the time, one of the most influential shows of his career, entitled "The Calculated Image".

In March 1969, Lewis took a trip to Europe. While in Paris, Lewis saw the works of Bill Hutson, Sam Middleton, and Edward Clark at the American Center for Students and Artists, as well as some work by Beauford Delaney at the United States Information Center. Afterward, he visited the Galerie Dürr in Munich to see the work of Lawrence Compton Kolawole. Inspired by the success that these artists (as well as Dean Dixon) had abroad, he secured a grant from the Smithsonian Institution to do a study on African-American artists who have moved abroad to pursue their artistic careers the following year. He conducted his study on the aforementioned visual artists with the additions of Herbert Gentry, William Johnson, Jacob Lawrence, and Henry Ossawa Tanner. Using this information, he guest-curated a show of the works of those artists entitled "Afro American Artists Abroad" at the University of Texas at Austin. He also was a guest-curator at the Baltimore Museum of Art in primitive art.

On December 9, 1990, the Murphy Fine Art Galleries were officially renamed to the James E. Lewis Museum of Art in his honor. An official dedication exhibition was held to celebrate his commitment to education and African-American art. Many artists donated works to the museum to celebrate its renaming, including Gordon Parks, Sam Gilliam, Grace Hartigan, Joyce J. Scott, Jack White, and Joan Erbe. Aaron Sopher also made an original illustration of Lewis for the museum. During his time at MSU, Lewis was able to collect over 3,000 works for the museum. Some of the artists represented in the museum's collection as a result of Lewis' collecting efforts include Hale Woodruff, Romare Bearden, Henri de Toulouse-Lautrec, Thomas Cole, Mary Cassatt, Robert Rauschenberg, and Pablo Picasso.

=== Archaeological digs ===
Lewis began visiting Africa originally to collect works of art for JELMA. He gave lectures at different West African universities for the American Society of African Culture in 1965, one of which was Ahmadu Bello University in Zaria, Nigeria. He became the area director of the ASAC the following year. During his visit, he met Epko O. Eyo, the director of antiquities of Nigeria while spending time in the city of Lagos. While in Africa, he was also the organizer of the Dakar Arts Festival. In 1965, at the recommendation of Eyo, Lewis returned to Nigeria to Owo to join a fourteen-person party on an archaeological excavation. This dig was his third trip to Nigeria and his seventh to Africa. The group labored in over 100 °F (38 °C) heat to excavate, work that uncovered thousands of terracotta artifacts and fragments. Lewis estimated that some of the items found at Owo, such as a leopard figure, were valued at over $100,000. Lewis returned twice after this to continue the search. Some of the oldest works from the site are dated to around the 12th century. These finds were significant in that they identified a cultural connection between ancient Ifẹ and Benin societies, visible through the similarities to both of their works. Lewis made 15 trips to Africa in his life, most of which were on behalf of the United States Information Agency.

Lewis also did some archaeological work in Israel.

=== Organizations ===
Lewis was a member of a number of different organizations. In 1962, he was appointed to the Maryland Fine Art Commission by Governor J. Millard Tawes. In addition to this, he was a member of the Baltimore City Commission for Historical and Architectural Preservation, the American Society of African Culture, the College Art Association, the Eastern Art Association, the American Federation of Arts, the Maryland Art Association, and the American Association of Museums. He was also a founding member of the Baltimore Council on Foreign Relations. Lewis also worked briefly with the Baltimore Symphony Orchestra.

== Artistic career ==
James E. Lewis was heavily inspired by the history and culture of African Americans and Africa. Lewis once said, "We need to be more supportive of our unique cultural heritage and its arts." One such example of his inspirations was gold weights of the Ashanti people. Another major influence for him was the masks of the Senufo culture. Lewis cited his success as a result of his capability to express himself within the limitations of a predominantly white art world. His primary means of gaining acceptance for his works was to create sculptures in a Western naturalistic or abstract expressionist style. He once said, "Had I gone in to meetings with their committee looking exotic in a dashiki and all the trappings worn by the young black activists who have knowledge of African aesthetic, my ideas would have been promptly rejected. But they accepted what I proposed because it seemed to them that I myself was quite within their norm, and they assumed that what I was proposing had to be sound, whether they fully understood it or not." He became the most comfortable with producing three-dimensional works during his first few years at MSU, referring to it as his métier, working on them whatever chance he got. His daughter said that he often would go nights without sleep to keep working on his art. Many of his works have been described as "socially charged".

=== Negro soldier controversy ===
Sometime before fall 1968, an anonymous donor put out a nationwide search for an artist willing to create a statue dedicated to African-Americans who had been involved in military conflict. A law firm, on behalf of the donor, sent a letter to Lewis to gauge his interest in the project, asking him to submit a sketch and a cost estimate. Due to the notion of Baltimore as a city of monuments, Lewis accepted the project. His original sketch for the work was revealed in The Baltimore Sun on October 4, 1968, which displayed a wreath and a list of wars that black soldiers had been a part of. The original estimate for the creation of the sculpture and the pedestal was between $23,000 to $25,000. In June 1968, the Baltimore Board of Recreation and Parks approved the location of the statue to be placed at Battle Monument Square. On October 3 of that year, the Baltimore Art Commission also approved of the statue's creation.

The choice of location incited a major controversy on the Baltimore political scene. Harry D. Kaufman, a member of the Park Board, criticized the fact that the statue was going to be of an unidentified black male, arguing that it was a tribute to a race as opposed to an individual. He suggested that the statue pay tribute to Crispus Attucks, Harriet Tubman, or Doris Miller instead. Additional arguments were also raised by the General Society of the War of 1812, the Constellation Committee, and the Star-Spangled Banner Flag House. Some concerns were raised about the location of the statue, which was a plaza dedicated to the fallen soldiers of Fort McHenry, which some believed would change the scope and meaning of the site. The work was also criticized for its choice to dress the soldier in modern clothing. Despite the criticism, Lewis refused to meet with his opponents to discuss any changes to the statue or location.

The work was completed by the famed New York foundry, Roman Bronze Works, in December 1971. Lewis had requested that the city pay for the work's pedestal, to be made of brick and marble and costing around $500, though the city did not approve this. The final cost of the work was about $30,000. The statue was erected in Battle Monument Square on May 30, 1972, and was covered in a black fabric. Weeks before the official unveiling of the statue, a vandal destroyed the fabric and exposed the statue. After this, the statue was further criticized for the direction it was facing, which was facing away from traffic along a one-way street, meaning that only pedestrians could appreciate the work.

The statue sat in Battle Monument Square for more than 30 years, after which time the African American Patriots Consortium made a request to have the statue moved to War Memorial Plaza, close to Baltimore City Hall. With the approval of the city as well as Lewis' wife and son, the statue was moved on January 12, 2007.

== Selected exhibition history ==
=== As a curator ===
- The Calculated Image, 1958, Morgan State University, Baltimore, Maryland
- Afro American Artists Abroad, March 29 – May 3, 1970, University Art Museum of the University of Texas, Austin, Texas
- Ethiopian artists in America: an exhibition of paintings, prints and photography, 1973, Morgan State University, Baltimore, Maryland
- African Masks: Variations on a Theme, March 10–31, 1979, Philadelphia College of Art, Philadelphia, Pennsylvania

=== As an artist ===
- Britain Salutes Baltimore Artists, 1975–1976, London, England
- Alone in a Crowd: Prints of the 1930s–1940s by African American Artists: From the Collection of Reba and Dave Williams, December 10, 1992 – February 28, 1993, Newark Museum, Newark, New Jersey, touring exhibition June 4, 1993 – March 30, 1997
- Life Impressions: 20th Century African American Prints from the Metropolitan Museum of Art, September 10 – November 4, 2001, Picker Art Gallery, Hamilton, New York

== Known works ==
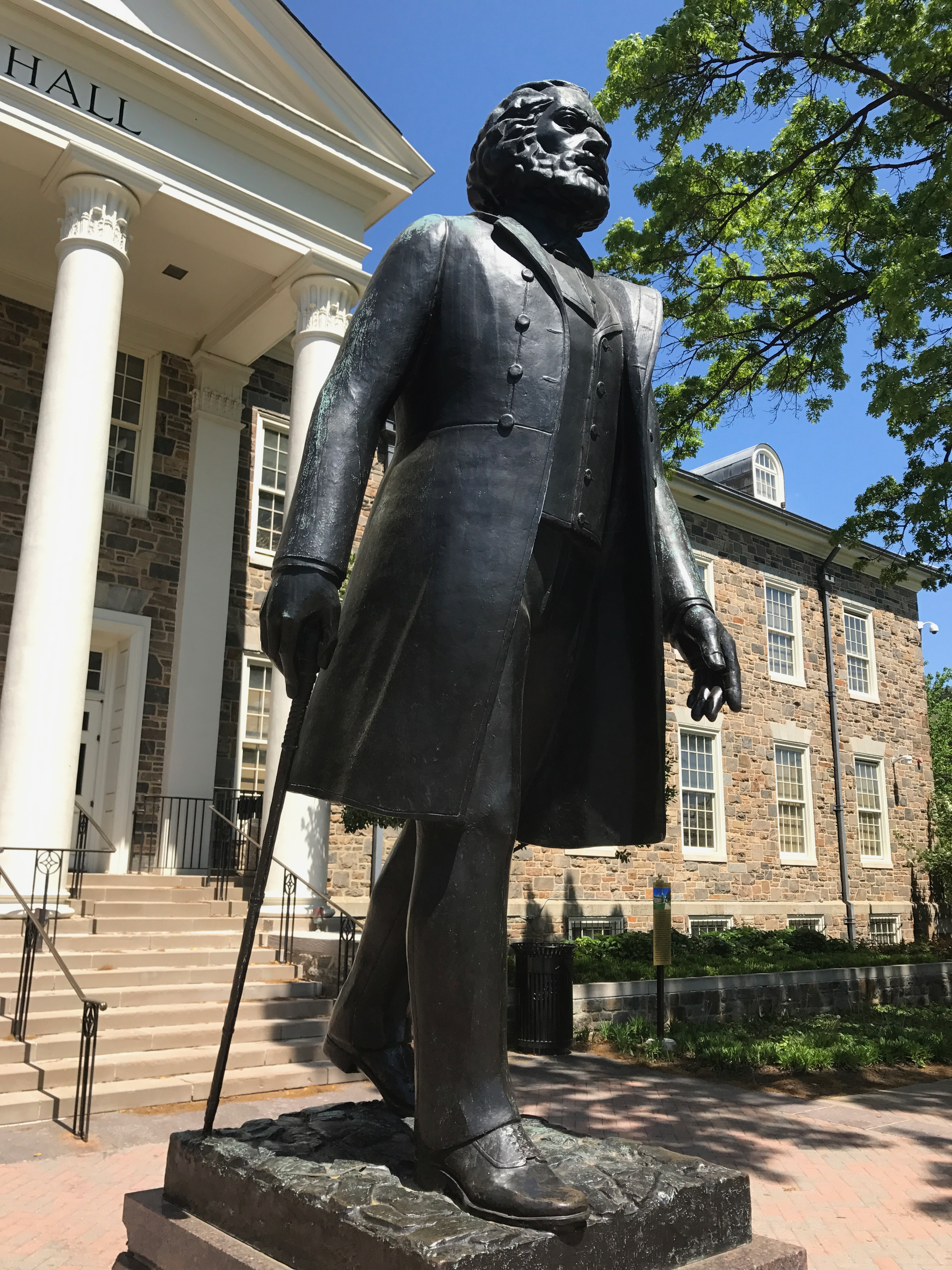
Frederick Douglass

- Frederick Douglass, sculpture in bronze, 1956, 8 ft height, Morgan State University, Baltimore, Maryland
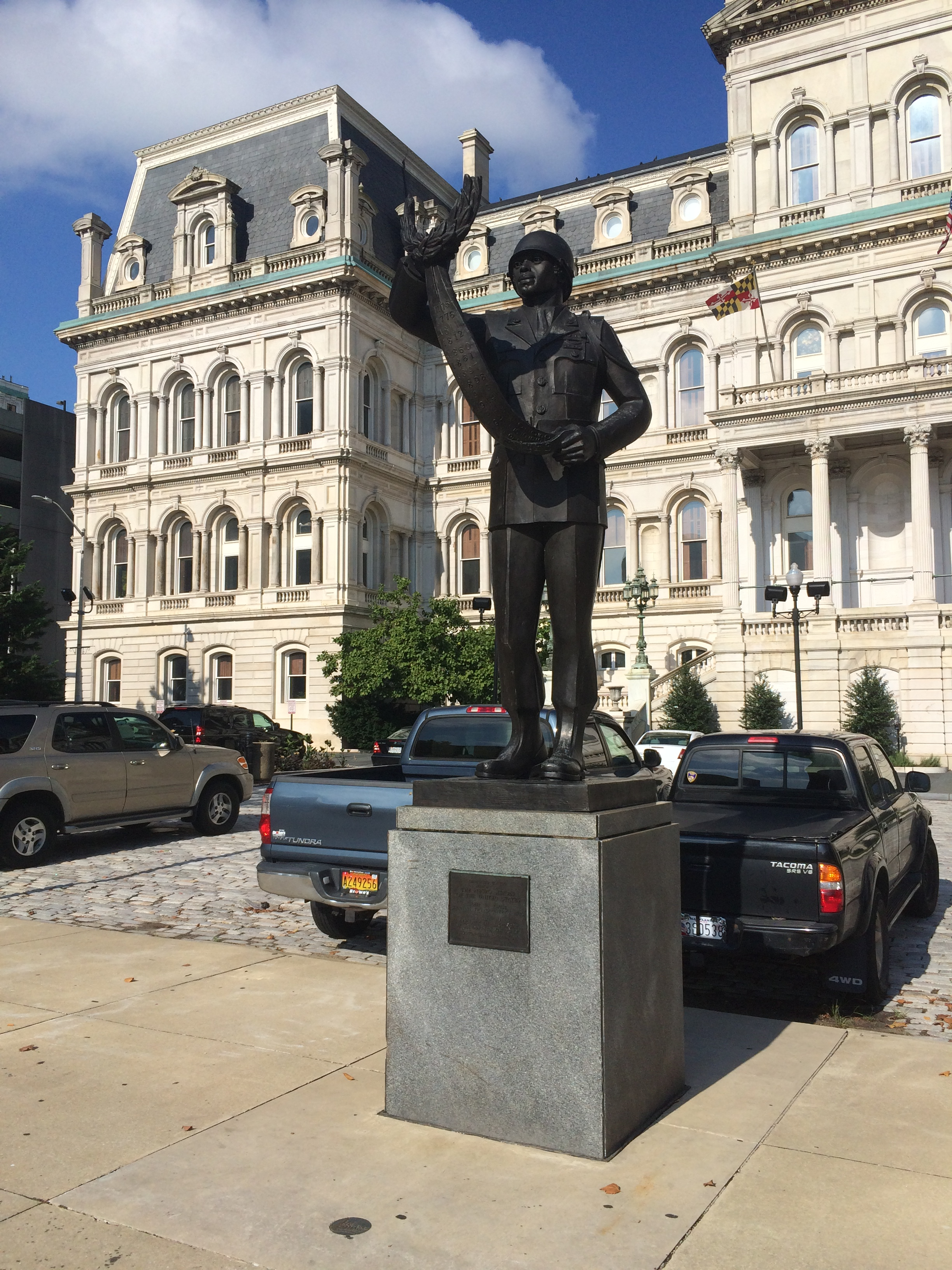
  Negro Soldier
- Negro Soldier, sculpture in bronze, 1971, 9 ft x 36 in x 55 in, War Memorial Plaza, Baltimore, Maryland
- An Ashanti (Ghana) Related Design, relief in bronze, 1969, 28 in x 42 ft x 5 in, Cherry Hill Junior High, Baltimore, Maryland
- Illegal Lovers, lithograph, 1947, 10 in x 12 in, Metropolitan Museum of Art, New York City
- Bad Omen, lithograph, 1947, 15${7 \over 8}$in x 10$7 \over 8$in, Metropolitan Museum of Art, New York City
- Fountain Sculpture, sculpture in bronze, 1970, 8 ft x 4 ft, Broadway, Baltimore, Maryland
- Untitled, sculpture in bronze, 1974, 5 ft 5$1\over2$in x 10 ft x 10 ft, Walter P. Carter Elementary School, Baltimore, Maryland
- Clarence Mitchell, Clarence M. Mitchell Jr. Courthouse, Baltimore, Maryland
- Martin Luther King Jr., sculpture in bronze, 8–9 ft height, 1982, King Center for Nonviolent Social Change, Atlanta, Georgia
- Fannie, 1950, Tyler School of Art, Philadelphia, Pennsylvania
- Untitled illustration of black students, illustration, November 22, 1971, The Chronicle of Higher Education
- An original pen and ink multiple-image drawing of Ralph Ellison, illustration, March 1970, CLA Journal
- Helmet Senufo Mask, illustration, Spring/Summer 1968, African Forum
- Firespitter Senufo Mask of the Korubla Society, two illustrations, Spring/Summer 1968, African Forum

Other works by the artist include sculptures of figures including Dwight O. W. Holmes, Theodore McKeldin, Carl J. Murphy, William H. Hastie, Charles Key, and Dr. Edward N. Wilson. The location of these works are currently unknown.

Lewis was known to have made multiple different sculptures of Frederick Douglass, the other two of which are unknown in location, as well as of Martin Luther King Jr., which exist in Lusaka, Zambia, and the King Memorial Park in Woodstock, Maryland.

Works by Lewis are also held in the collections of the Baltimore Museum of Art, Howard University, and Clark Atlanta University.
