= Robert Kelly =

Robert, Bob or Rob Kelly may refer to:

== Arts and entertainment ==
=== Music ===
- Robert Kelly (composer) (1916–2007), American composer of classical music
- Bob "Git It" Kelly (fl. 1950s), songwriter and member of the Rockabilly Hall of Fame
- Rob Kelly (rapper) (born 1978), Irish rapper
- R. Kelly (born 1967), American R&B singer and songwriter

=== Other media ===
- Robert Kelker-Kelly (1964-2026), American soap opera actor
- Robert Kelly (comedian) (born 1970), American standup comedian
- Robert Kelly (poet) (born 1935), American poet
- Robert Kelly (character), a fictional character in the Marvel Comics universe, named for the poet
- Percy Kelly (artist) (1918–1993), also known as Bob Kelly
- Robert Kelly (artist) (born 1956), American artist
- Bob Kelly (author) (born 1971), IT author and deployment specialist

== Sports ==
=== American football ===
- Bob Kelly (American football, born 1925) (1925–2016), American football player
- Bob Kelly (American football, born 1938) (1938–2014), American football player
- Rob Kelly (American football) (born 1974), American football player

=== Association football ===
- Bob Kelly (footballer) (1893–1969), English footballer of the 1920s
- Robert Kelly (football chairman) (1902–1971), chairman of Celtic from 1947–71
- Bob Kelly (footballer, born 1919) (1919-2001), see List of Bury F.C. players (1–24 appearances)
- Rob Kelly (born 1964), English football manager and former player

=== Baseball ===
- Bob Kelly (baseball) (1927–2024), 1950s baseball player
- Roberto Kelly (born 1964), Panamanian-born Major League Baseball player

=== Other sports ===
- Rob Kelly (cricketer) (born 1969), Australian cricketer
- Robert Kelly (cricketer) (1936–2019), New Zealand cricketer
- Robert Kelly (curler), Scottish curler and coach
- J. Bob Kelly (born 1946), Canadian NHL player; played for the St. Louis Blues, Pittsburgh Penguins, and Chicago Black Hawks
- Bob Kelly (ice hockey, born 1950), Canadian NHL player; played for the Philadelphia Flyers and Washington Capitals
- Bob Kelly (rugby league), Irish rugby league footballer who played in the 1950s, and coached in the 1960s
- Robert Kelly (rugby union) (1907–1975), Scottish rugby union player
- Robert Kelly (Gaelic footballer), Gaelic football for Kildare
- Bob Kelly (wrestler) (1936–2014), American professional wrestler and booker

== Other ==
- Robert Kelly (political analyst) (born 1972), American political scientist
- Robert F. Kelly (born 1935), United States federal judge
- Robert J. Kelly (born 1938), United States Navy admiral who was commander in chief of the Pacific Fleet between 1991 and 1994
- Robert P. Kelly (born 1954), former CEO of the Bank of New York Mellon
- Robert L. Kelly (born 1957), anthropologist
- Robert Talbot Kelly (1861–1934), English orientalist landscape and genre painter
- Robert Kelly (naval officer) (1913–1989), executive officer of Motor Torpedo Boat Squadron 3 in World War II
- Robert Kelly Jr., accused in the Little Rascals day care sexual abuse trial
- Robert Kelly (politician) (1845–1920), South Australian MHA
- Robert Kelly (surgeon) (1879–1944), professor of surgery at the University of Liverpool

== See also ==
- Bert Kelly (disambiguation)
- Robert Kelley (disambiguation)
