= Senator Kelley =

Senator Kelley may refer to:

- Alfred Kelley (1789–1859), Ohio State Senate
- Delores G. Kelley (born 1936), Maryland State Senate
- Edward J. Kelley (1883–1960), Connecticut State Senate
- Harrison Kelley (1836–1897), Kansas State Senate
- Keith Kelley (fl. 2020s), Alabama State Senate
- James Kelley (Pennsylvania state senator) (born 1932/1933), Pennsylvania State Senate
- Robert S. Kelley (1831–1890), Kansas State Senate
- Steve Kelley (politician) (born 1953), Minnesota State Senate

== See also ==
- Senator Kelly (disambiguation)
