= Sharon Horvath =

American painter, educator (b. 1958)

- Born: December 5, 1958 (age 67); Cleveland, Ohio, United States
- Education: Cooper Union (BFA), Tyler School of Art (MFA), Skowhegan School of Painting and Sculpture
- Occupations: Visual artist, educator
- Known for: Painting, mixed media
- Awards: Anonymous Was A Woman Award (2005), Rome Prize (1997), Guggenheim Fellowship (1992)

Sharon Horvath (born 1958) is an American visual artist and educator. She teaches at State University of New York at Purchase. Her artwork is mixed media and made with materials such as pigments, inks, and polymer.

== Early life and education ==
Sharon Horvath was born on December 5, 1958, in Cleveland, Ohio.

She attended Cooper Union (BFA 1980) in New York City, and Tyler School of Art at Temple University (MFA 1985) in Philadelphia, Pennsylvania. In the summer of 1985, she attended Skowhegan School of Painting and Sculpture.

== Career ==
Horvath's artwork is generally made on canvas or mounted paper, and involved a mixture of materials such as pigments, inks, and polymer. Her early art fluctuated between abstraction and figurative. Her later art is abstract, often colorful, and inspired by topographical maps.

Horvath teaches at State University of New York at Purchase (Purchase College) since 2006. From 2011 to 2013, she was a department chair at Purchase College. She has also taught at the University of the Arts, Philadelphia, and Massachusetts College of Art and Design.

She was awarded the Anonymous Was A Woman Award in 2005, the Guggenheim Fellowship for fine arts in 1992, and a fellow at the Fine Arts Work Center in Provincetown, Massachusetts from 1985 to 1986. She became a National Academician in 2015, awarded by the National Academy of Design in New York City. She was awarded the Rome Prize by the American Academy in Rome in 1997.

Her work is in museum collections, including the Cleveland Museum of Art, the National Academy of Design, and Utah Museum of Fine Arts.

== Exhibitions ==
=== Solo exhibitions ===
- 1990, Sharon Horvath, Zoe Gallery, Boston, Massachusetts, U.S.
- 1998, Works from Rome, University of Virginia, Fayerweather Gallery, Charlottesville, Virginia, U.S.
- 1998, Sharon Horvath, Tibor De Nagy Gallery, New York City, New York, U.S.
- 2001, Sharon Horvath: Recent Paintings, Tibor De Nagy Gallery, New York City, New York, U.S.
- 2005, Sharon Horvath: Beds and Ball Fields, Victoria Munroe Fine Art, Boston, Massachusetts, U.S.
- 2010, Sharon Horvath, Lori Bookstein Fine Art, 138 10th Ave, New York City, New York, U.S.
- 2014, Sharon Horvath: Cosmicomics’ and ‘Varanasi Notebook, Lori Bookstein Fine Art, 138 10th Avenue, New York City, New York, U.S.
- 2019, Owls Stare at Paintings’ Busted Eyeballs, Pierogi Gallery, 155 Suffolk Street, New York City, New York, U.S.

=== Group exhibitions ===
- 1985, New American Talent 1985, Laguna Gloria Art Museum, Austin, Texas, U.S.
- 1985, 44th Annual Awards Painting Exhibition, Cheltenham Center for the Arts, Cheltenham, Pennsylvania, U.S.
- 1985, Hudson D. Walker Gallery, Provincetown, Massachusetts, U.S.
- 1988, Paintings by Sharon Horvath and Drawings by Susan Hambleton, Cava Galleries, Philadelphia, Pennsylvania, U.S.
- 1990, Contemporary Philadelphia Artists: A Juried Exhibition, April 22 to July 8, 1990, Philadelphia Museum of Art, Philadelphia, Pennsylvania, U.S.
- 1992, Drawings, Victor Munroe Gallery, 130 Prince Street, New York City, New York, U.S.; featuring Sharon Horvath, Gregory Amenoff, Suzanne Bocanegra, Elizabeth Dworkin, Robert Kelly, Patrick Cauley, Naoto Nakagawa
- 1997, Place, Muhlenberg College, Martin Art Gallery, Allentown, Pennsylvania, U.S.; featuring Horvath, Mary Hambleton, Robin Hill, and Suzanne Bocanera
