= Ernest Crichlow =

American painter and illustrator (1914–2005)

- Born: June 19, 1914; Brooklyn, New York
- Died: November 10, 2005 (aged 91)
- Education: School of Commercial Illustrating and Advertising Art in New York, New York University
- Known for: Murals, Illustration
- Movement: Social Realism
- Patrons: Augusta Savage

Ernest Crichlow (June 19, 1914 – November 10, 2005) was an American social realist artist known for his narrative paintings and illustrations from the Depression-era, which focused on social injustice and the realities faced by African Americans.

== Early life and career ==
Ernest Crichlow was born in Brooklyn, New York, in 1914 to Barbadian immigrants. He was the second child of nine children. Crichlow's father was a skilled mason and cricketer. With Crichlow's interesting in drawing beginning during his youth, his parents encouraged him to pursue art. He studied art at the School of Commercial Illustrating and Advertising Art in New York and New York University. Crichlow started work as an artist in a studio sponsored by Works Progress Administration's Federal Art Project. Augusta Savage was an early patron of his work, as was the case for many of the artists of the Harlem Renaissance.

== Career ==
His first exhibition was in 1938 in the Harlem Community Center in Harlem, New York. One of his best known works, the lithograph Lovers III shows a young black woman being harassed in her bedroom by a member of the Ku Klux Klan. Crichlow's work was exhibited in the 1939 New York World's Fair and in the Library of Congress the following year.

Over the next few decades, his work was regularly shown in leading US art galleries especially in the northeast although he held two exhibitions in Atlanta University in the 1940s. By the end of his career, his work had been honored by President Carter. His 1967 painting White Fence showing a young white girl being separated by a fence from five black girls was the most notable from his later career along with a 25-panel mural at Boys and Girls High School in Brooklyn.

Crichlow was also well known as an illustrator for children's literature, providing art work for Two in a Team, Maria, Lift Every Voice and Magic Mirrors. In 1958, he founded the Brooklyn's Fulton Art Fair. He founded the Cinque Gallery located in New York City in 1969 with Norman Lewis and Romare Bearden to showcase art by African American artists. Crichlow taught art at the City College of New York, the State University of New York at New Paltz, Shaw University in Raleigh, North Carolina, the Brooklyn Museum Art School and the Art Students League.

Crichlow was a member of Spiral, an African American artist collective that was formed in 1963 and disassembled in 1966. The group's mission was to contribute to the civil rights movement while maintaining their identities as individuals and artists. Spiral organized one art exhibition and is notable for their thought-provoking discussions on the African American experience, African American image, and other topics surrounding civil rights and social justice.

At the time of his death on November 10, 2005, he was a resident of Fort Greene, Brooklyn. Crichlow's cause of death was heart failure.
