= Herbert Kelly (disambiguation) =

Herbert Kelly was a priest.

Herbert Kelly or Kelley may also refer to:

- Herb Kelly, baseball player
- Herbert Kelley, radioman and namesake of Kelley Nunatak
- Herbert Kelley, designer of World War I Aeroplanes Fokker D.VII

== See also ==
- Bert Kelly (disambiguation)
