= Bill Hutson =

African-American abstract painter and fine artist

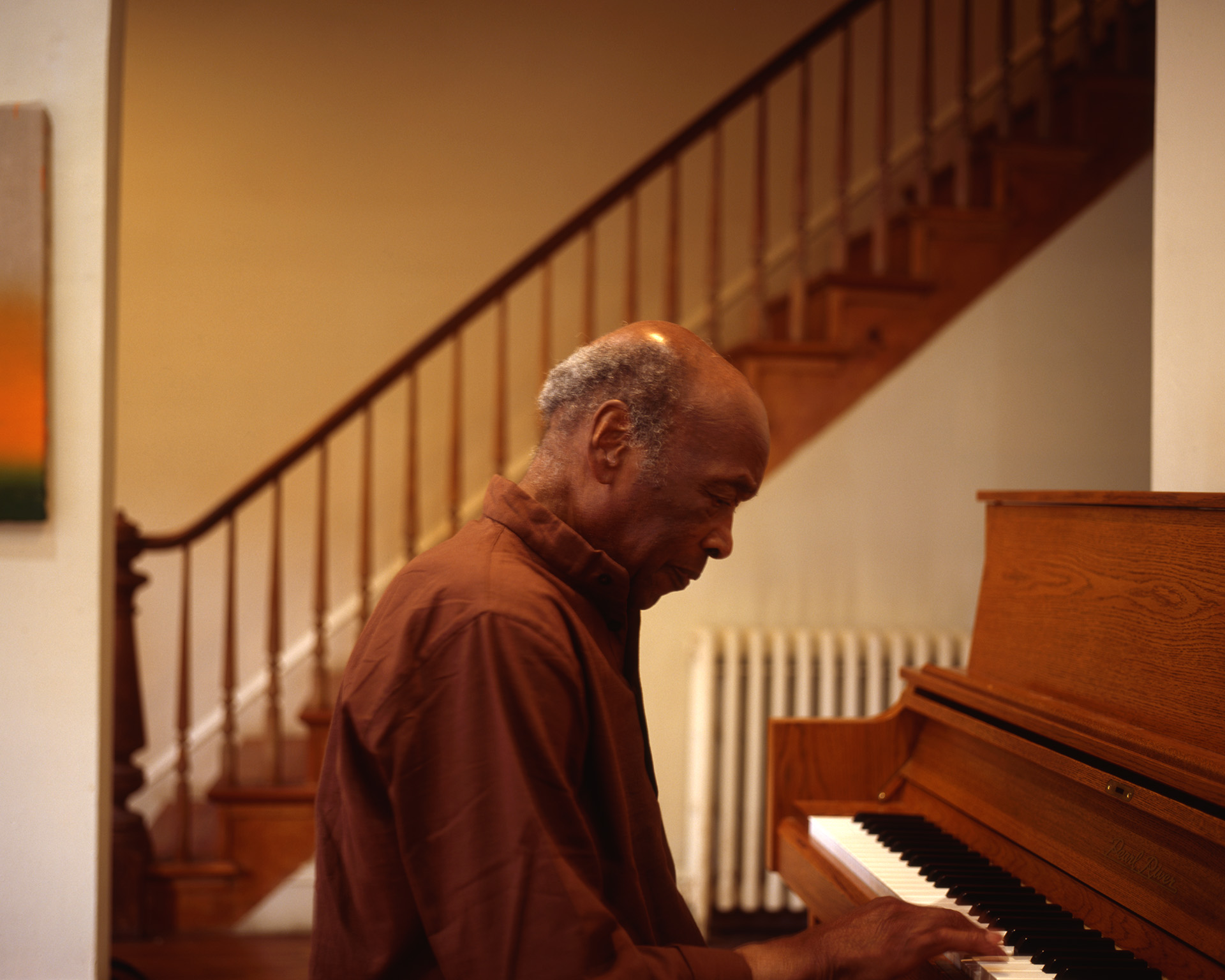
- Bill Hutson in 2022
- Born: September 6, 1936; San Marcos, Texas, U.S.
- Died: September 21, 2022 (aged 86); Lancaster, Pennsylvania, U.S.
- Other name: William R. Hutson
- Occupation: Abstract fine artist
- Known for: Painting and collage

William R. Hutson (September 6, 1936 – September 21, 2022) was an African-American abstract painter. Active since the early 1960s, he began his career in San Francisco, moving between Europe, Africa, and the US before settling in Lancaster, Pennsylvania.

== Early life ==
Bill Hutson was born in San Marcos, Texas in 1936. His father was a musician who died when Hutson was five years old; his mother, a custodian at the local college, died ten years later. At that time, Hutson and his siblings moved to San Antonio to live with relatives. He drew throughout his childhood and took a correspondence course in drawing but was not aware of art as a career until his late teens.

== Education ==
Hutson studied at the San Marcos Colored High School until 1952. He finished his high school diploma at the Phyllis Wheatley High School in San Antonio in 1956 when he enlisted in the United States Air Force. Alongside his public schooling, Hutson studied drawing, design, and color theory from 1951-1955 with Art Instruction Inc., a correspondence school. While in the Air Force, he took a drawing course at the University of New Mexico in Albuquerque from 1956 to 1957. He took occasional courses at Los Angeles City College (1958-59) aqne Los Angeles Trade Technical College (1959), and the San Francisco Academy of Art in 1960-61.

After completing high school, he spent two years in the Air Force before moving to Los Angeles, where his brother and uncle lived. He worked briefly as a file clerk at the Golden State Mutual Life Insurance Company; their expansive collection of African and African American visual art was his first exposure to fine art. Shortly after, he moved to San Francisco, where he began making both figurative and abstract paintings. He had very little formal training, although he took an occasional course in New Mexico and Los Angeles. He briefly studied at the San Francisco Academy of Art (1960-61) and was an assistant to Frank N. Ashley (1960-62). This apprenticeship gave Hutson an introduction to art by Sargent Claude Johnson, David Park, Elmer Bischoff, Joan Brown, Richard Diebenkorn, Frank Lobdell, Deborah Remington and others. As Hutson familiarized himself with these artists, he completed and exhibited abstract art at the John Bolles Gallery, Fred Maxwell Gallery, and at SFMoMA (1962-65).

While in San Francisco, Hutson spent time at the City Lights Bookstore where Lawrence Ferlinghetti helped introduce him to European writers and artists. He read and met many of the Beat writers and interacted with the Black Panthers. Often, Hutson allowed Black students from Berkeley to gather at his studio on 17th street.

== Career ==
Hutson left San Francisco for London in 1962. After a short stay there, he moved to Amsterdam followed by Paris. From 1962 to 1971, Hutson painted and lived in London, Paris, Amsterdam, Rome, Ibadan and New York. He returned to the US in 1971 when he subleased Joe Overstreet's studio in the Bowery in New York. During this time he was introduced to Al Loving, Bob Blackburn, Melvin Edwards and many other New York artists. Loving introduced Hutson to the dealer, William Zierler, who purchased some of the work Hutson made in Paris. A Cassandra Foundation Award in 1972 took him to Uzés, France, where he rented a studio for the year. In 1973, Hutson returned to the US and was based in San Antonio, where he worked at the Southwest Crafts and Creative Arts School (now merged with the University of Texas) until July 1974, when a National Endowment of the Arts award took him back to France. That same year, he moved to Nigeria at the invitation of Ola Balogun where he served as the Graphic Arts Officer at The National Museum in Lagos from July 1974 until February 1976.

During residence in New York City (ca. 1976-84) Hutson met other artists such as Vivian Browne, Frank Bowling, Peter Bradley, Robert Indiana, James Little, Kenneth Noland, Howardena Pindell, Robert Rauschenberg, Larry Rivers, Haywood (Bill) Rivers, William T. Williams, and Jack Whitten who were all Hutson’s “neighbors” and interlocutors in SoHo and midtown Manhattan. Many remained friends throughout his life.

In Europe and West Africa, Hutson had met and associated with artists Iba N'Diaye, Souleymane Keita, Edward Clark, Sam Middleton, Joan Mitchell, Beauford Delaney and Barbara Chase-Riboud. Hutson had significant professional contact with Robert Matta-Echaurren through whom he met Max Ernst and Wifredo Lam when completing an edition of etchings at the Georges Visat Print-Making Workshop in Paris.

Hutson showed in multiple group and solo shows throughout his career, establishing a longtime relationship with Cinque Gallery in New York City. In 1987, his exhibition, "Bill Hutson: Paintings, 1978-1987," at the Studio Museum in Harlem was accompanied by a full-color catalogue featuring an essay by Kellie Jones.

Between 1984 and 1987 Hutson taught at the Ohio State University. This was followed by a stint at Johns Hopkins University and in 1989 he began work at Franklin & Marshall College in Lancaster, PA, where he taught courses on African-American art and painting. He left in 1996 but returned in 1999 to resume teaching as a Visiting Associate Professor of Art. In 2005, he became the Jennie Brown Cook and Betsy Hess Cook Distinguished Artist-in-Residence, a position he held until his passing in 2022. Hutson continued painting despite being declared legally blind due to glaucoma in 2000.

During his time at F&M, Hutson turned his attention to curating exhibitions, because, in his own words, "few curators realize the extent to which African-American artists have participated in aesthetic developments in abstract art in America.” He felt that they had been largely excluded from scholarly works, museums and galleries due to both their race and age. Uncomfortable with the trend where the perceived "old" is pushed out in favor of the "new," thereby usurping or "outweigh[ing] the decades of experience, highly developed skill, and refined visions of mature artists,” Hutson put together an exhibition addressing these concerns. "Something To Look Forward To,” at the Phillips Museum of Art at Franklin & Marshall College, opened in 2004. It considered the impact of African American artists who remained loyal to abstraction throughout their long careers, and featured work by artists Howardena Pindell, Alvin Loving, Edward Clark and Sam Gilliam. It subsequently traveled to seven other museums around the country.

In 2025, four of his works were included in "Paris Noir" at the Centre Pompidou.

== Collections ==
Hutson's work is included in Petrucci Family Foundation, the Brooklyn Museum, the Schomburg Center, the Newark Museum, the Studio Museum in Harlem, and the Pennsylvania Academy of Fine Arts. The largest collection is housed at Franklin and Marshall College's Phillips Museum. In addition to his paintings, F&M also holds the contents of his studio, library, catalogs, assorted papers and his personal collection of artworks.

== Awards ==
- 1972 Cassandra Foundation Award, Chicago, IL
- 1974 National Endowment for the Arts
- 1980 CAPS (Creative Artists in Public Service) New York, NY
