= Monica J. Freeman =

African-American filmmaker

Monica J. Freeman (born 1947) is an independent Black feminist filmmaker and arts administrator.

Freeman earned her MFA from Columbia University. According to one article, "In the early '70s, Monica Freeman's documentaries heralded a new generation of Black women producing independent films about Black women."

Freeman began her career with Nafasi Productions, a Black filmmaking collective under the tutelage of John Wise, where she directed Valerie: A Woman, An Artist, A Philosophy of Life (1975). This film serves an important role in the canon of biographical films among Black female artists. The 1977 documentary A Sense of Pride: Hamilton Heights featured an all-women crew, including Ayoka Chenzira.

In 1976, under artist Faith Ringgold's suggestion, she programmed films for the Sojourner Truth Festival of the Arts, Focus on Film, which is believed to be the first Black women's film festival in the United States.

She later lived in Houston and served as Program Coordinator for the Atlanta African Film Society.

== Filmography ==
- Valerie: A Woman, An Artist, A Philosophy of Life (1975), 15-minute, documentary about Valerie Maynard, a New York-based printmaker and sculptor who was, at one time, an Artist-in-Residence at the Studio Museum of Harlem.
- A Sense of Pride: Hamilton Heights (1977),15 minutes, which explores the lives of the people in the neighborhood of Hamilton Heights in Harlem.
- The Children's Art Carnival: Learning Through the Arts (1978), 17 minutes, which examines the Children's Art Carnival in Hamilton Height with then director, artist Betty Blayton Taylor.
