= Cynthia Hawkins =

African American Artist

Cynthia Hawkins (born January 29, 1950) is a painter and sculptor. In February 2023, Hawkins was awarded the Helen Frankenthaler Award for Painting.

== Early life and education ==
Cynthia Hawkins was born to Elease Coger Hawkins and Robert D. Hawkins on January 29, 1950. Raised in Queens, New York, Hawkins is the eldest of 5 siblings. Her early fascination with prehistoric art would later manifest in a career as an artist. As a child, Hawkins spent time watching art instructor Jon Gnagy on the television program "Learn to Draw" and as a teenager, taught herself watercolor painting. After graduating from John Bowne High School in 1968, Hawkins took classes at the Brooklyn Museum Art School and later the Provincetown Workshop. In 1969, she began taking Saturday drawing classes at the Art Students League and took classes part-time at Queens College. By the early 1970s, Hawkins became a full time student and though she had considered pursuing several other career paths, she ultimately decided to study art. The first in her family to attend college, Hawkins graduated from Queens College in 1977 with a B.A. in Studio Arts. Hawkins went on to receive three additional degrees after graduating college, including an M.F.A from the Mt. Royal Graduate School of Painting at the Maryland Institute, College of Art (1992), an M.A. in Museum Professions from Seton Hall University (2008), and her Ph.D. in American Studies from the University of Buffalo (2019) with a dissertation titled, “African American Agency and the Art Object, 1868-1917.”

In addition to being an artist, Hawkins has served as an independent curator, Director of Galleries at Cedar Crest College, Gallery Director and Curator at State University of New York Geneseo, and is currently the Deputy Director at Kenkeleba House. She has also served as an Adjunct Instructor at Northampton Community College, SUNY Rockland Community College, and SUNY Geneseo. Cynthia Hawkins currently resides in Rochester, New York with her partner and his dog.

== Career and style ==
Throughout the 1970s and 80s, Hawkins primarily produced abstract paintings and sculptures, exploring visual concepts based in geometry and astronomy. She produced paintings with hieroglyphical elements and polyethylene sculptures hung from the ceiling. In her early career, Hawkins frequented the Museum of Modern Art, New York and spent time exploring galleries on Madison Avenue where she met Linda Good Bryant and became involved with Just Above Midtown (JAM). Bryant introduced Hawkins to David Hammons and later Corrine Jennings and Joe Overstreet. In 1978, she exhibited in Summer Show: It’s a Crowd at JAM and had her own solo exhibition at the gallery by 1981. In 1985, Hawkins was invited to exhibit her work in the show Carnival: Ritual of Reversal at Kenkeleba House Gallery, a non-profit gallery founded by Jennings and Overstreet. Hawkins would go on to develop relationships with other artists at the center of the burgeoning black-owned gallery scene in 1970s/80s New York such as Camille Billops, Vivian E. Browne, and Emma Amos and Thelma Golden.

By the late 1980s, Hawkins turned her focus towards creating large expressionistic paintings. Her series Currency of Meaning contains arrows, circles, and triangles which serve as a visual vocabulary replicated across the artist's oeuvre. Hawkins explored religion in the early 1990s before creating the Natural Things (1996), an evolution of work that began from the artist's examination of the shapes that emerge from the physical world. This led Hawkins to create Signs of Civilization in the early 2000s, a series in which the artist abstractly depicts naturally occurring forms and manmade incursions from 30,000 feet above. In 2019, Hawkins began to re-engage with her full practice and has since continued to use natural earthbound forms such as boulders and rocks to initiate paintings. These paintings, however, are not meant to be representational; rather, they are meant as reinterpretations of natural occurrences. In her current work, Hawkins continues to integrate her lifelong interest in themes centered around nature, the cosmos, science, and mark making while remaining invested in creating new kinds of color relationships.

Hawkins has been an Artist in Residence at several institutions including the Studio Museum in Harlem in 1987, the Virginia Center for the Creative Arts in 1996, the Experimental Printmaking Institute at Lafayette College in 2005, and the Butterfly House in Le Grange, Georgia in 2014. Most recently, Hawkins was included in the survey exhibition Just Above Midtown: 1974 to Present at the Museum of Modern Art, New York (2022), The Inseparables at STARS Gallery, Los Angeles (2023), So let us all be citizens too at David Zwirner, London (2023), Art Basel: Kaufmann Repetto Gallery Group Exhibition, Milan (2023), and Hollybush Gardens Gallery, London (2023).

== Exhibitions ==
Hawkins’ solo exhibitions include Natural Things, 1996–99, STARS, Los Angeles (2022); Clusters: Stellar and Earthly, Buffalo Science Museum, Buffalo (2009); New Works: The Currency of Meaning, Cinque Gallery, New York (1989); and Cynthia Hawkins, Just Above Midtown/Downtown Gallery, New York (1981). She exhibited in Just Above Midtown: Changing Spaces, at the Museum of Modern Art.

Her work is in numerous public collections, including The Studio Museum in Harlem, New York; The Bronx Museum of the Arts, New York; Kenkeleba Gallery, New York; The La Grange Art Museum, La Grange, Georgia; and the Department of State, Washington, D.C.

She has received the Brooklyn Museum Art School Scholarship, The Herbert and Irene Wheeler Grant and the Black Metropolis Research Consortium Fellowship.

She is represented by Paula Cooper Gallery.

== Awards ==
• Black Metropolis Research Consortium Fellowship, 2009

• Rockland Community College Award for Artistic Excellence, 1996

• The Herbert and Irene Wheeler Grant, 1995

• Rockland Community College Award for Artistic Excellence, 1995, 1994

• Patricia Roberts Harris Fellowship, United States Department of Education (Full Academic Fellowship) 1990-1992

• Atlanta Life Insurance Company, Exhibition and Competition, Atlanta, GA (2nd place Mixed Media 1984)

• Brooklyn Museum Art School Scholarship, Brooklyn, NY (Watercolor 1972)

• Provincetown Workshop Scholarship, Provincetown, MA (Painting 1975)

== Selected catalog essays ==
• "Historicizing African American Abstraction, Printmaking, and Activism in 1960s and 1970s New York City"

• "Extending the Notion of Activism in Wes and Missy Collection of African American Prints and Works on Paper"
