= War Memorial Plaza =

Square in Baltimore

Coordinates: 39.2909°N 76.60964°W

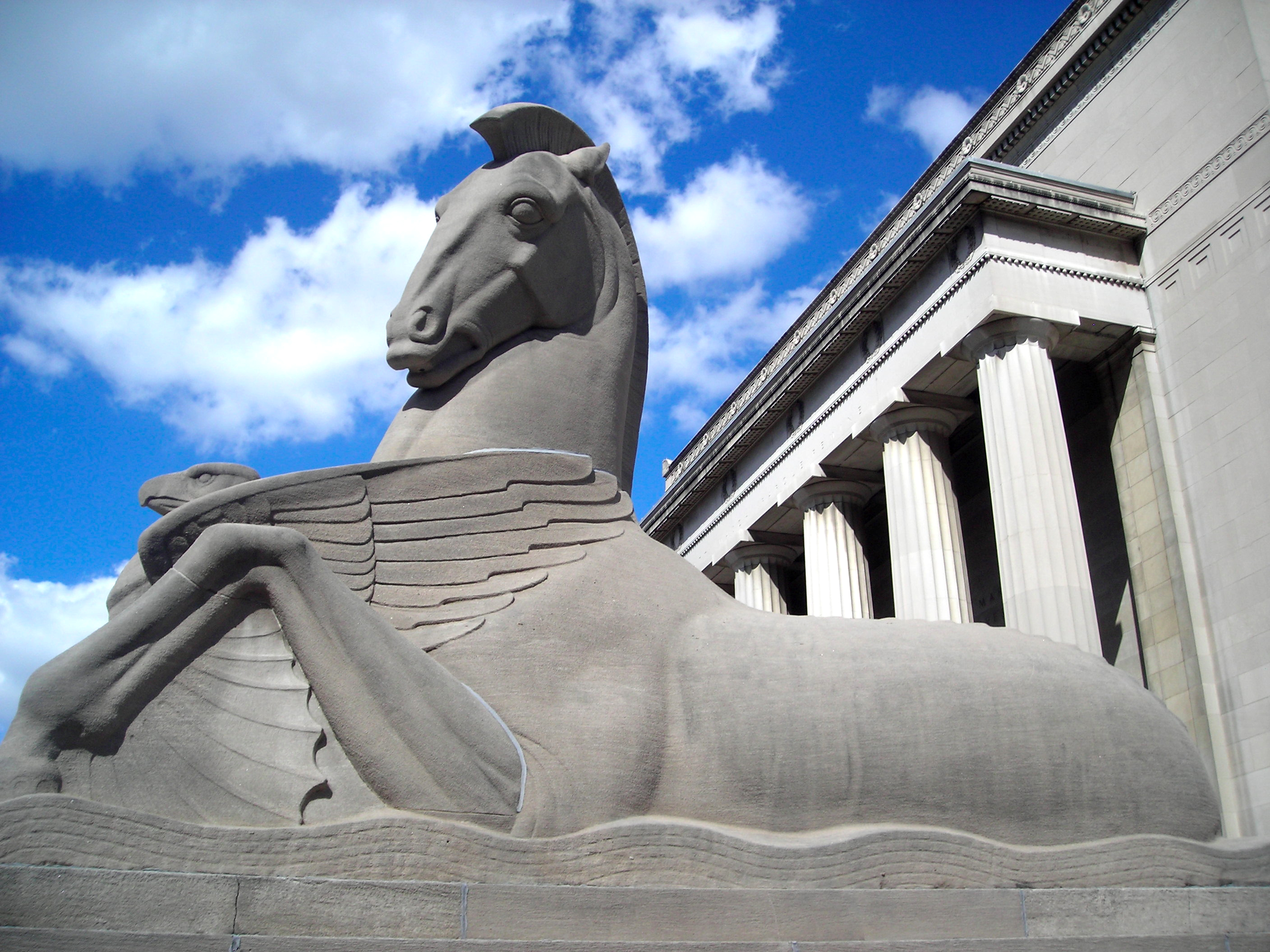
Limestone horse and eagle at the War Memorial building

War Memorial Plaza is a public square, small park and space in Downtown Baltimore between City Hall and the War Memorial Building, between Holliday Street on the west, East Fayette Street on the south, North Gay Street on the east, and East Lexington Street on the north.

== History ==
On the northwest corner of the present square facing the intersection of Holliday and East Lexington Streets were a set of townhouses that were the sites for the opening of Loyola High School and Loyola College in 1852 by the Roman Catholic Society of Jesus (Jesuits). After a brief time, the two institutions relocated in 1855 to the west side of North Calvert Street between East Madison and Monument Streets in a large central Italianate building with a front portico connected to St. Ignatius Roman Catholic Church which had been recently completed on the north. They remained here (along with a large similarly styled addition to the south along East Monument Street in the 1890s) until the mid-20th Century with the College relocating in 1922 to its present "Evergreen" campus in North Baltimore City near Homeland community at North Charles Street and East Cold Spring Lane, next door to the landmark "Evergreen Mansion", (of the Garrett Family railroad and financier family giants) and the High School moved in 1934/1941 to "Blakefield" in west Towson, north of the city in Baltimore County. Inala 1975, the old Loyola complex was converted into a performing arts center for the decade-old Center Stage, which had relocated after a fire the previous year at their space on East North Avenue, between Charles and Calvert Streets.

A few doors to the south in the middle of the block was "Prof. Knapp's School", attended by many German immigrant students including the noted Henry Louis Mencken, (1880-1956), the famed "Baltimore Sun" newspaper reporter, editor, columnist, author and linguist in the late 1880s, just before he graduated and went on to the former "Baltimore Manual Training School" (founded 1883) in the late 1890s (now renamed 1893) the Baltimore Polytechnic Institute on the east side of Courtland Street [presently St. Paul Place and Street] - now near "Preston Gardens" opposite the site of Mercy Hospital (now Mercy Medical for Center).

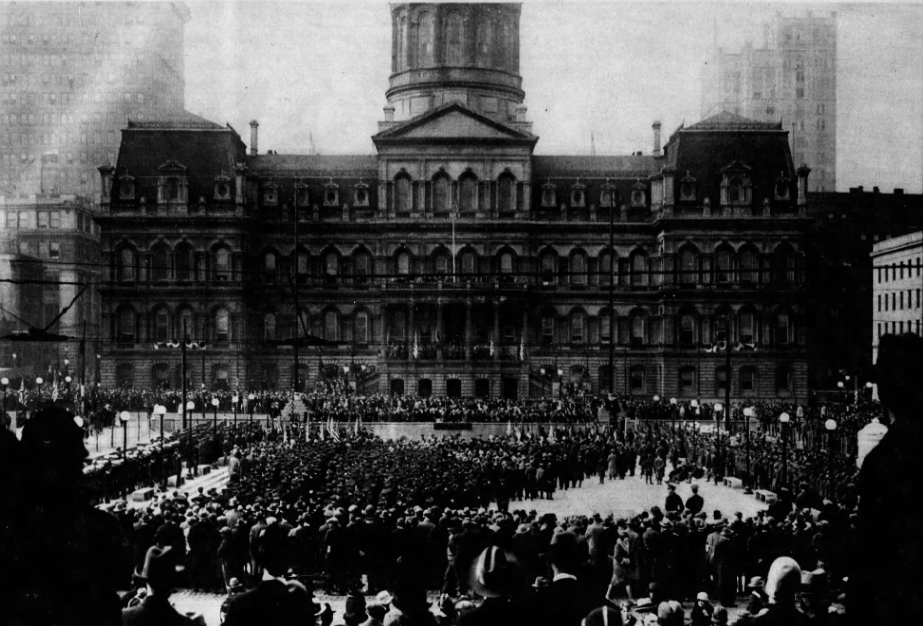
War Memorial Plaza in 1927

From its dedication in 1875 to 1917, the new second Baltimore City Hall faced the also the second building of the famed "Old Drury", the nickname of the Holliday Street Theatre rebuilt in brick and stone in 1813, (replacing first playhouse built of wood in 1795), designed by famous local architect Robert Cary Long, with a front facade in stone of Greek Revival style which was the most notable playhouse in Baltimore for decades. It is said that the first public singing of the future National Anthem reputedly by Ferdinand Durang, (c.1785-1831), occurred on the stage here in late September 1814, near the end of the War of 1812, when the poem of "The Defence of Fort McHenry" written by American Georgetown lawyer and amateur poet Francis Scott Key, when he was on board an American truce ship anchored downriver on the lower Patapsco River from the British Royal Navy fleet as it bombarded Fort McHenry on Whetstone Point guarding Baltimore Harbor during September 12–14, 1814 several weeks earlier and set to music with the tune "To An Anacreon in Heaven", a so-called English social society drinking song. It was also reputedly said to be re-sung lustily by the "after-the-show" crowd at the next door Theatre Tavern, (to the south, towards East Fayette Street between and adjacent to the "Assembly Rooms" on the corner) of Captain McCauley.

To its south at the northeast intersection of Holliday with East Fayette Street was the landmark "Old Assembly-Rooms", built also in 1799 by Robert Cary Long, Sr. of Georgian/Federal styled architecture for the old Baltimore Dancing Assembly, founded in the 1780s with elaborate decorative chambers and drawing rooms for social dancing, receptions and levees for the upper middle class ladies and gentlemen of the era. On its upper floor were housed the influential Library Company of Baltimore - a non-circulating subscription library founded in the late 1790s and later supplemented with the adjacent Mercantile Library. So the landmark structure was the center of social, cultural and intellectual activities in the growing Baltimore Town. By the mid-1840s, with the later addition of a third floor replacing its original pitched roof with a pointed stone pediment facing its Fayette Street south side and now with a flat roof with a stone balustrade earlier in 1835, (for illustration of remodeled building, see "Wikipedia" entry for "Baltimore City College"), the "Rooms" were occupied by the young men of the then decade-old "Central High School of Baltimore", later renamed the "Baltimore City College" in 1866. Founded in 1839, a few blocks away to the northwest on Courtland Street (now St. Paul Street/Place/Preston Gardens, C.H.S. (now the B.C.C.) was later considered to be the third oldest public high school in America.

Both influential landmark structures were destroyed in a large disastrous fire in 1873, and the Central High School later moved to new quarters especially built for it by for the first time by 1875 of Tudor Revival/Jacobethan Revival style of building at the southwest corner of North Howard and West Centre Streets, but the venerable Holliday Street Theatre was rebuilt on its original site and later owned by the famous John T. Ford, (1829–1894), local politician/municipal board member and East Coast playhouse operator, who was also proprietor of the infamous Ford's Theatre in Washington, D.C. where 16th President Abraham Lincoln was assassinated in April 1865 after the end of the American Civil War (1861–1865).

Two years after being rebuilt, the theatre was overwhelmed by the massive sized pile of marble and granite French Second Empire styled architecture with construction across the street to the west in the new domed Baltimore City Hall of 1867–1875 by George A. Frederick, (1842–1924), a municipal architect who also designed a lot of the structures in the new Druid Hill Park (established 1860) and other city structures. By the time that the theater and its surrounding block (Holliday to Fayette to North Gay to East Lexington Streets) was torn down in 1917, based on the 1910 plans of Frederick Law Olmsted, to make room for the newly laid-out War Memorial Plaza and Building, as a major rearrangement of a proposed new "civic center" of flanking municipal office buildings and structures providing additional space to be used in future decades, covering up the then unsightly canalized stream of Jones Falls to the east with its periodic flooding problems, and to open up a vista of the elaborate east front of the Baltimore City Hall, an influence of the then-nationwide "City Beautiful" movement among architects and city planners then coming to rise. The War Memorial Building was designed by local famous architect Laurence Hall Fowler and originally dedicated to Marylanders who died in World War I and built in the early 1920s, dedicated 1925 and is one of many World War I Memorials for "The Great War" throughout the world built in the various participating Allied nations since the conflict of 1914–1918.

== Present ==
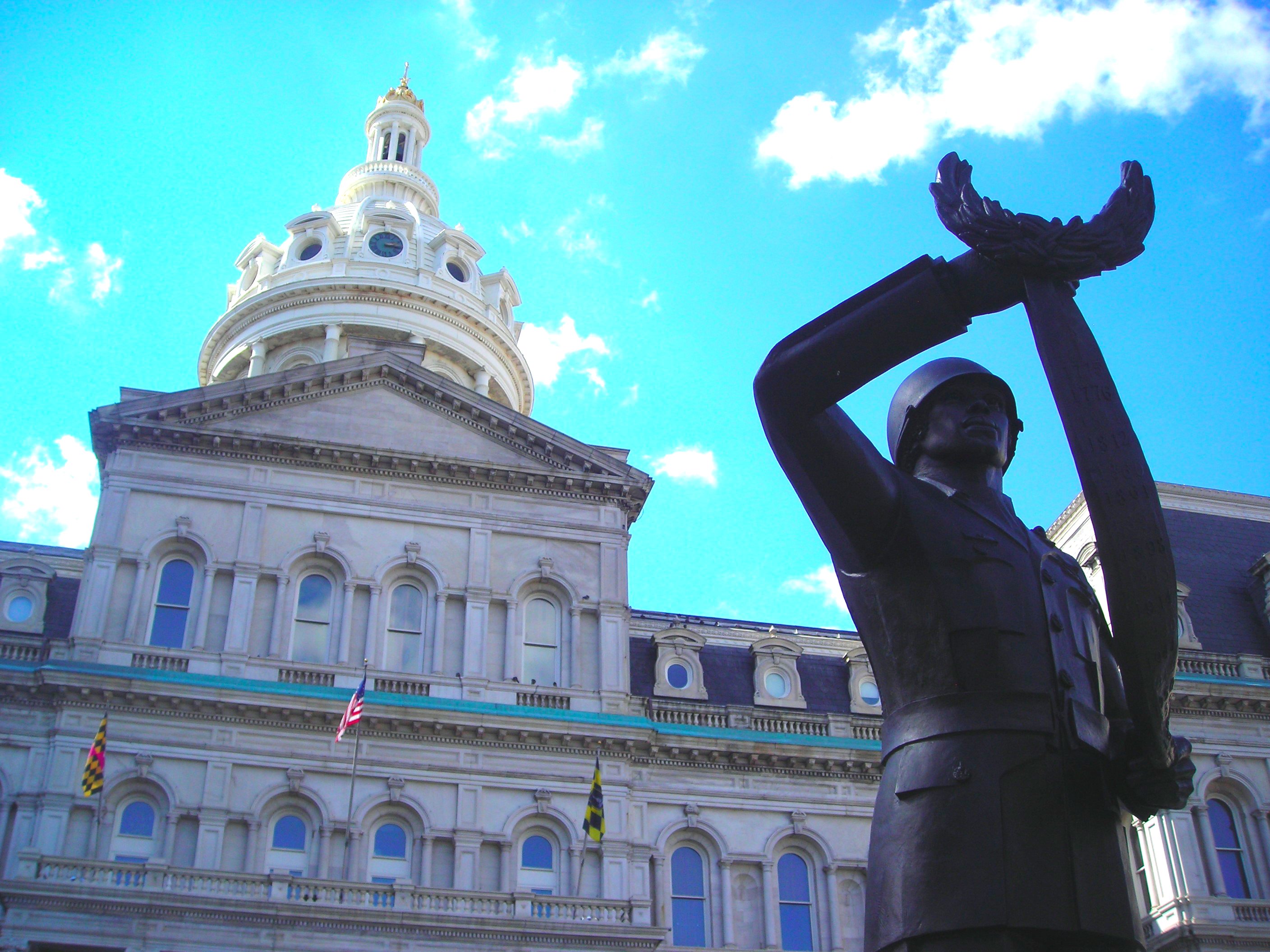
"Negro soldier" statue by sculptor James E. Lewis from 1971 in front of east side of City Hall, relocated 2007 from Battle Monument Square

War Memorial Plaza is a major component of Baltimore's municipal center (aka "civic center") now officially referred to as the Business and Government Historic District and is included in the Baltimore National Heritage Area, under sponsorship of the city, State and the National Park Service of the U.S. Department of the Interior.

The plaza contains the statue "Negro Soldier", also originally called the "Negro War Heroes Monument". It was created by local sculptor James E. Lewis in 1971. The statue originally sited at the north end, facing up North Calvert Street at the Battle Monument Square between East Lexington and East Fayette Streets, two blocks west) was relocated to War Memorial Plaza in 2007 after 30 years of facing the wrong way on a one-way street.
