= Bert Kelly (disambiguation) =

Bert Kelly is the name of:

- Bert Kelly (1912–1997), Australian politician and magazine columnist
- Bert Kelly (jazz musician) (1882–1968), American jazz musician and bandleader

== See also ==
- Albert Kelly (born 1991), Australian rugby player
- Robert Kelly (disambiguation)
- Bertram Kelly (1884–1976), British electrical engineer
- Burt Kelly (producer) (1898-1983), film producer and writer
- Herbert Kelly (disambiguation)
