= Robert S. Kelley =

For a list of other people named Robert Kelley see Robert Kelley (disambiguation)
Robert S. Kelley (1831-1890) was a pro-slavery advocate during the Kansas-Missouri border war, a state senator in Kansas during the government formed under the Lecompton Constitution, and served as the fifth U.S. marshal of the Montana Territory.

== Biography ==
Kelley was born in Fredericksburg, Virginia, January 11, 1831. At the age of ten years he was sent to Newport, New Hampshire, to attend a preparatory school before entering Dartmouth College. Disliking the rigid discipline enforced at the preparatory school, he ran away. He had no money nor acquaintance in New Hampshire, but managed to reach Lowell, Massachusetts, where he went to work on the Advertiser. Knowing that if discovered by his parents he would be obliged to return to the preparatory school, he did not communicate with them for a period of five years, during which time he remained steadily at his post at the Advertiser, learning all the details of the printing business. When he learned that his family had moved to Missouri, he joined them there in 1848, and for four years was employed as salesman in a mercantile house.

In 1852 Kelley started a Democratic newspaper at Liberty, Missouri, called the Democratic Platform, and continued its publication until the passage of the Kansas-Nebraska Act, when he discontinued the Platform and established a pro-slavery paper in Atchison, Kansas, called the Squatter Sovereign. Dr. J. H. Stringfellow joined Kelley in this venture as partner and associate editor. This was in 1855, during the intense excitement attending the settlement of Kansas and Nebraska. The paper was the leading organ of the Democratic party in Kansas, and was strongly pro-Southern and pro-slavery. Concerning his experience at the time, Kelley said: "There was no such thing as concession at the time. We were all extremists, whether advocating or opposing slavery. During my editorial life I was in constant strife with political opponents."

== Confederate service ==
Kelley was elected a member of the State Senate under the Lecompton Constitution for the counties of Atchison and Doniphan. On the defeat of the Lecompton Constitution by Congress, Kelley sold out his interest in the Squatter Sovereign and moved to Doniphan County, Kansas, where he married Miss Mary L. Foreman, and where his first child (Mrs. Kate Napton) was born. He next engaged in merchandising in Kansas City, and was thus employed when the Civil War broke out. The first company of Union soldiers that entered the city took possession of his store and carried off all his goods. Soon after he joined the Missouri State Guards as a private, and served under General Sterling Price. After the Battle of Pea Ridge he was promoted to a captaincy. The colonel, lieutenant colonel, and major of the regiment were killed in battle, and by right of seniority he commanded the regiment for a long time. On returning from a campaign in Mississippi, the regiment was reorganized, and Kelley was assigned to the recruiting service, after which his connection with the Confederate army terminated.

== U.S. marshal ==
During the war Kelley's property was confiscated by the government, and he never made any effort to recover it. After leaving the Confederate service he, with his family, emigrated to Montana and arrived in Alder Gulch in 1863. From Alder Gulch he went to Helena, and for some time mined in Grizzly Gulch. In 1866 he went to Bear Gulch, where he remained a short time, after which he moved to Deer Lodge, where he and his family finally settled. For several years after he moved to Deer Lodge he engaged in mercantile pursuits in partnership with Mr. J. S. Pemberton, in which business he continued for about five years. He then became engaged extensively in mining operations. He took on placer mining grounds at Pioneer City and in Squaw Gulch, about 1872, and was engaged in working these placers until the last few years of his life, when he was disposed of the principal part of his interests. He was one of the original incorporators of the Rock Creek Ditch Co., organized in an early day, and still at the time of his death had an interest in that company. He was at the time of his death largely interested in the Southern Cross and other mining claims in the neighborhood of Cable, Montana.

In 1885 Kelley was appointed by President Grover Cleveland the 5th United States Marshal for Montana, and served in that office with official integrity until the day President Benjamin Harrison was inaugurated, when he resigned, believing that the party in power should have control of all the Federal patronage and be held responsible for it.

== Children ==
When Robert Kelley died, he left his wife and seven children. Four of his children were married, Mrs. Kate Napton, wife of the District Court Clerk; Mrs. Nannie Joslyn, wife of Hon. C.D. Joslyn, manager of the E. L. Bonner store at Deer Lodge; Robert Lee Kelley and Mrs. Georgia Hoss, wife of Lon R. Hoss of Spokane Falls. The three other children were young - Florence, Howard and Lamar.

== Death ==
Hon. Robert S. Kelley died in Deer Lodge, Montana on September 19, 1890, of heart disease.
