= Long Key Natural Area and Nature Center =

Protected area in Florida

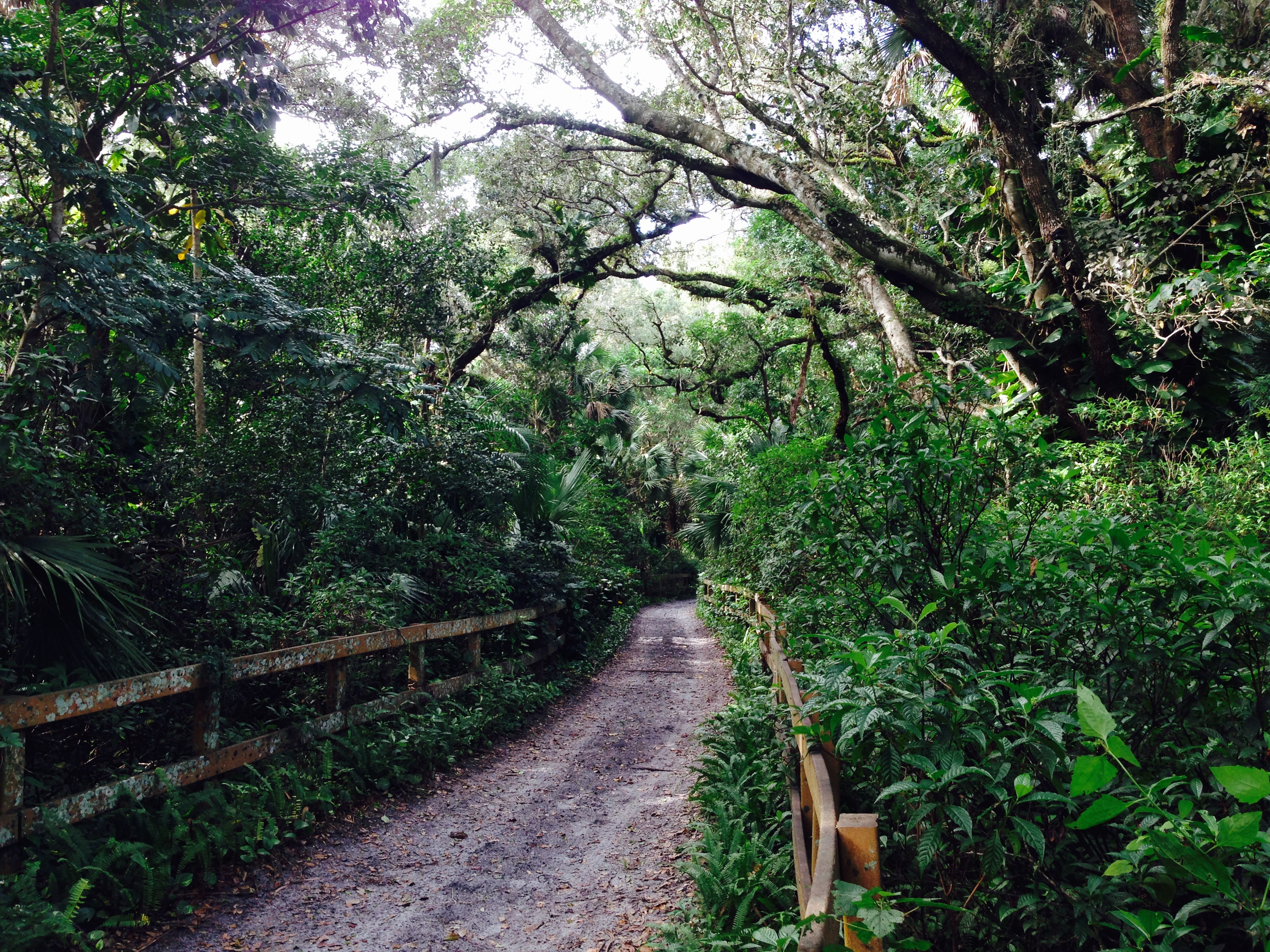
- A trail in the Long Key Natural Area

- Location within Florida
- Location: Davie, Florida, United States
- Coordinates: 26°4′36″N 80°19′30″W
- Website: https://www.broward.org/Parks/Pages/park.aspx?park=22

Long Key Natural Area and Nature Center is a protected area with trails and rental facilities in Broward County, Florida. The 157-acre park is managed by Broward County Parks and Recreation. It was established in 2008. The area's ecology includes elevated oak hammock.

It is at 3501 SW 130th Avenue in Davie, Florida. Funding for construction of the nature center and boardwalk was part of a $400 millions bond measure in Broward County.

== History ==
The area was the location of Pioneer City and the Kapok Tree Restaurant.
