= Robert Kelley =

Robert Kelley may refer to:

- Robert Kelley (academic administrator) (born 1944), president of the University of North Dakota
- Bob Kelley (1917–1966), American football and baseball broadcaster
- Bob Kelley (triple jumper) (1897–1965), American Olympic athlete
- Bob Kelley (American football) (1930–2025), American football center
- Robert E. Kelley (1933–2021), American Air Force officer
- Robert F. Kelley (1894–1976), American government official
- Robert S. Kelley (1831–1890), state senator in Kansas and U.S. Marshal of the Montana Territory
- Robert Kelley (American football) (born 1992), American football running back
- Robert Kelley (runner) (1921–?), winner of the 800 m at the 1945 USA Outdoor Track and Field Championships

== See also ==
- Robert Kelly (disambiguation)
