= Senator Kelly =

Senator Kelly may refer to:

- Robert Kelly (character), fictional U.S. Senator appearing in American comic books published by Marvel Comics

== Members of the United States Senate ==
- James K. Kelly (1819–1903), U.S. Senator from Oregon from 1871 to 1877
- Mark Kelly (born 1964), U.S. Senator from Arizona since 2020
- William Kelly (Alabama politician) (1786–1834), U.S. Senator from Alabama from 1822 to 1825

== United States state senate members ==
- Bernard Kelly (American politician) (1823–?), New York State Senate
- David M. Kelly (1841–disappeared 1916), Wisconsin State Senate
- Dick M. Kelly (1941–2023), South Dakota State Senate
- George Bradshaw Kelly (1900–1971), New York State Senate
- James A. Kelly Jr. (1926–2013), Massachusetts State Senate
- John F. Kelly (Michigan politician) (1949–2018), Michigan State Senate
- Joseph D. Kelly (New York City) (1887–1953), New York State Senate
- Kate Kelly (politician) (fl. 2000s–2010s), Idaho State Senate
- Kevin C. Kelly (fl. 1980s–2010s), Connecticut State Senate
- Laura Kelly (born 1950), Kansas State Senate
- Molly Kelly (born 1949), New Hampshire State Senate
- Morley Garfield Kelly (1892–1956), Wisconsin State Senate
- Percy R. Kelly (1870–1949), Oregon State Senate
- Pete Kelly (Alaska politician) (born 1956), Alaska State Senate
- Ralph Kelly (1920–2005), Nebraska State Senate
- Randy Kelly (born 1950), Minnesota State Senate
- Richard F. Kelly (1936–2015), Illinois State Senate
- Scott Kelly (politician) (1927–2005), Florida State Senate
- Tim Kelly (Alaska politician) (1944–2009), Alaska State Senate
- William Kelly (New York state senator) (1807–1872), New York State Senate

== See also ==
- Senator Kelley (disambiguation)
- Kelly (disambiguation)
- Eva Kelly Bowring (1892–1985), U.S. Senator from Nebraska in 1954
- Kelly Ayotte (born 1968), U.S. Senator from New Hampshire from 2011 to 2017
- Kelly Loeffler (born 1970), U.S. Senator from Georgia from 2020 to 2021
