= Business and Government Historic District =

Historic district in Maryland, United States

- U.S. National Register of Historic Places
- U.S. Historic district
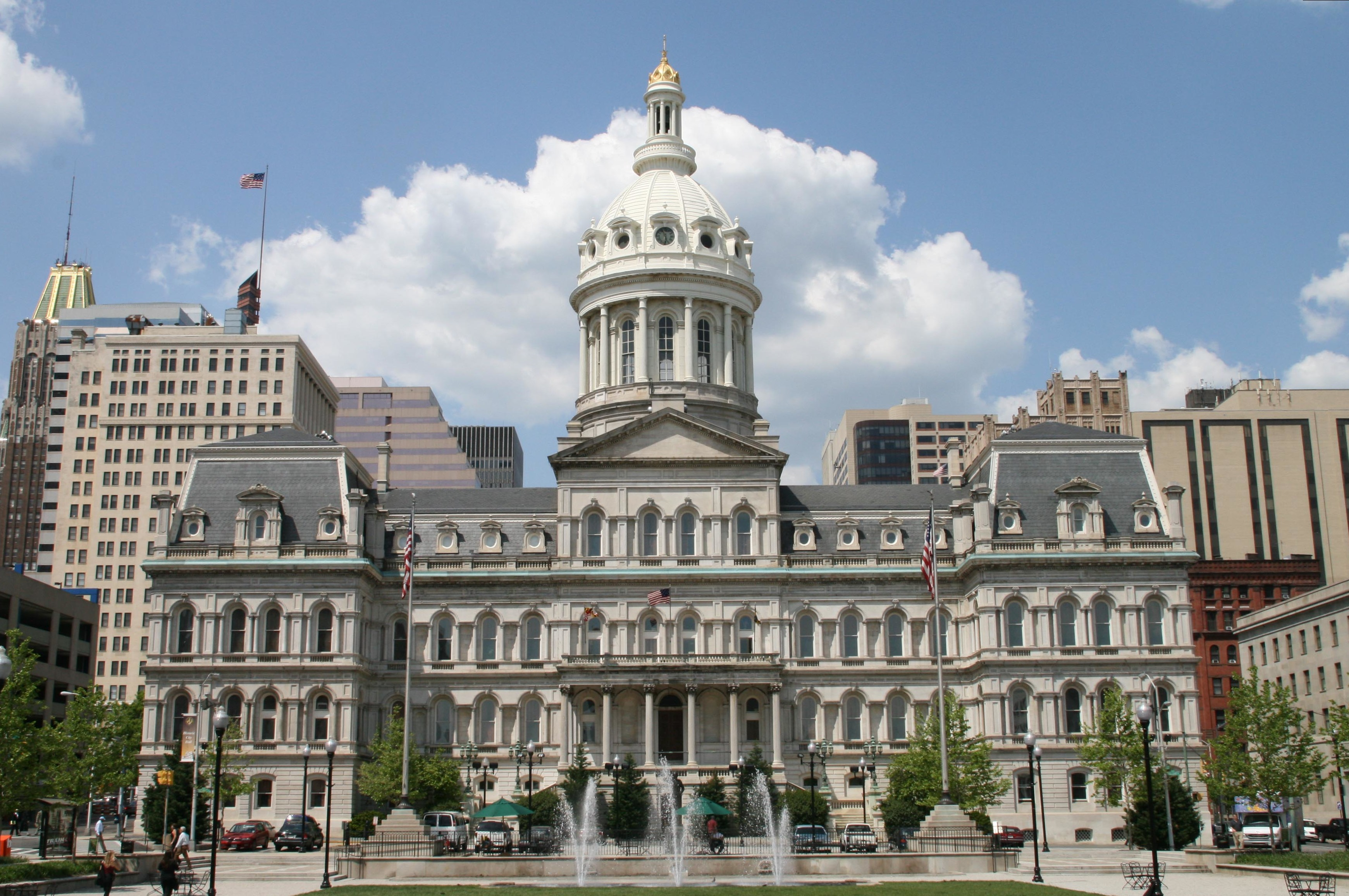
- Baltimore City Hall

- Location within Baltimore Location within Maryland Location within the United States
- Location: Roughly bounded by Saratoga Street, City Blvd., Water, Lombard, & Charles Streets, Baltimore, Maryland
- Coordinates: 39°17′24″N 76°36′39″W
- Area: 73 acres (30 ha)
- Architect: Multiple
- Architectural style: Late 19th And 20th Century Revivals, Late Victorian, Art Deco
- NRHP reference No.: 87002065
- Added to NRHP: November 25, 1987

The Business and Government Historic District is a historic district in downtown Baltimore, Maryland, United States, that was listed on the National Register of Historic Places in 1987. The district comprises the center of Baltimore's municipal government and the eastern portion of Baltimore's commercial district. The major feature of the district is the War Memorial Plaza with City Hall to the west and the War Memorial to the east.

The district includes several Registered Historic Places, including Baltimore City Hall and Battle Monument. It is within Baltimore National Heritage Area. Other contributing properties include the B&O Railroad Headquarters Building.
