= Robin Holder =

American artist (born 1952)

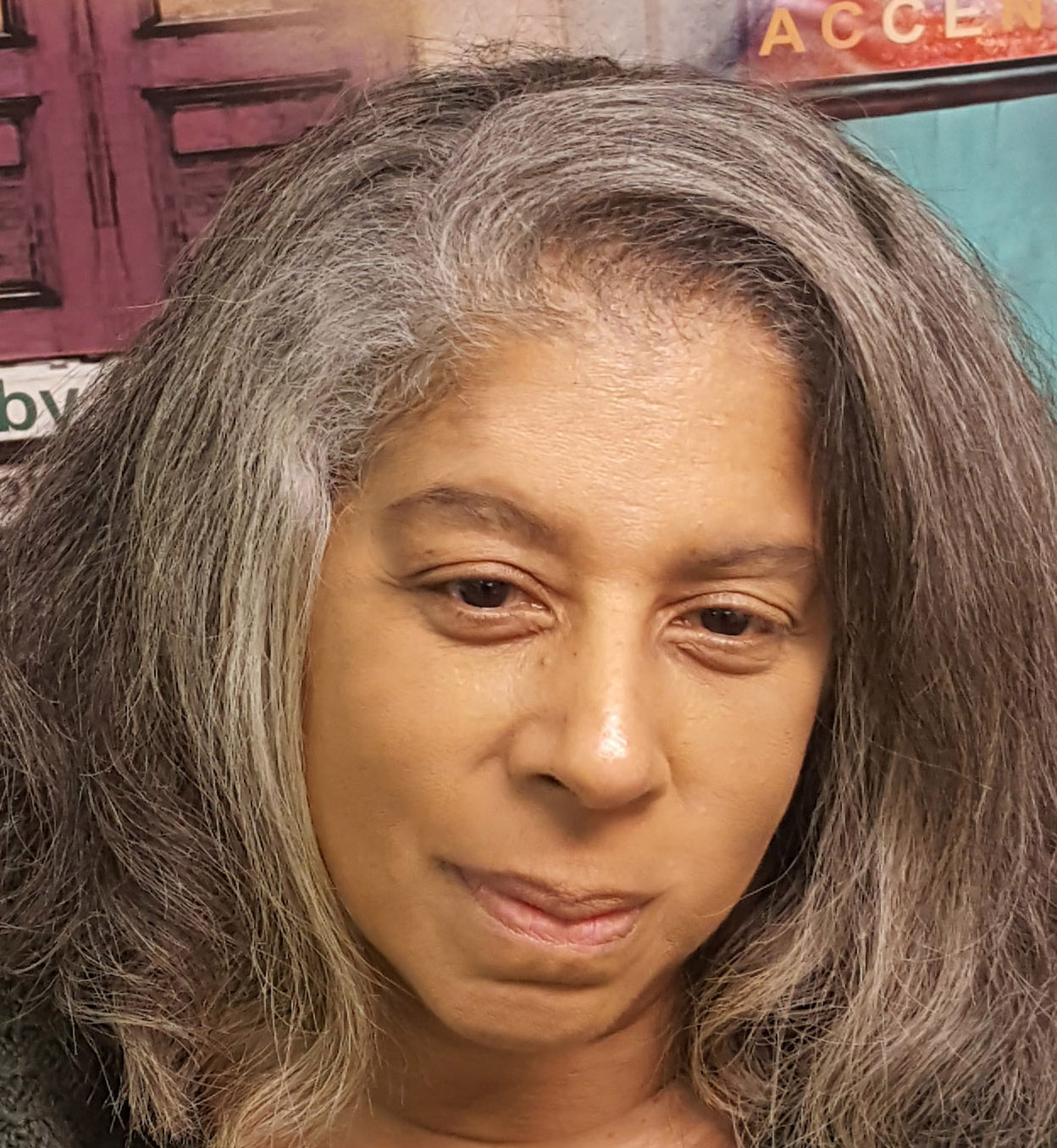
- Born: Chicago
- Education: LaGuardia High School Of Music and Arts
- Alma mater: The Art Students League of New York
- Known for: mixed-media printmaking, paintings and public installations

Robin Holder (born 1952) is a contemporary American visual artist and activist Holder is known for her mixed-media printmaking and paintings which focus on themes of spiritual and racial identity, class, social justice, and personal experience. Robin Holder was commissioned to create several site-specific public art installations throughout the Northeastern United States, including New York City and New Jersey. A number of her two-dimensional works can be found in several collections, including the Library of Congress, the Washington State Arts Commission, and the Schomburg Center for Research in Black Culture. Robin has been involved in arts education for over thirty years.

== Early life and education ==
Robin Holder, born in Chicago in 1952 and raised in New York City, is the daughter of an African American Episcopalian father and a Caucasian Russian American Jewish mother. Her family and the communities she engaged with from an early age were focused on social issues and political activism, making her conscious of the apparent gendered, racial, religious and socio-economic disparities around her. Robin attended high school in New York City, graduating in 1969 from the LaGuardia High School Of Music and Arts. Holder received a scholarship to The Art Students League of New York (1969–71) where she studied under Marshall Glasier, Vaclav Vytlacil, Morris Kantor, and Rudolf Baranik. After studying at The Art Students League of New York, Holder moved to Mexico and spent time creating art. She also worked for a year at the Amsterdams Grafisch Atelier studying lithography (1976-1977) and after became the assistant director for Robert Blackburn's Printmaking Workshop in New York City until 1986.

== Career ==
After leaving her position at Bob Blackburn's Printmaking Workshop, Holder went on to become a master teaching artist at The Studio in a School and a resident artist educator at The Children's Museum of Manhattan until 1989, when she received a grant from the Manhattan Graphics Center. She was then sponsored by the New York State Council on the Arts in a residency program with El Museo del Barrio. From 2004 to 2006 Holder trained art teachers on how to use the Blueprint for Teaching and Learning in the Arts program. Holder received the Individual Visual Artist Grant from the Brooklyn Arts Council in 1999, then in 2001, she was a selected artist for the Mid Atlantic Arts Foundation's Artist As Catalyst program in 2005 and a guest artist at the Temple Visual Arts Festival. In addition, Holder was an invited artist at the Experimental Printmaking Institute and Lafayette College in 2011.

== Public works and installations ==
  - 2006 – Migrations, Flushing Avenue station (BMT Jamaica Line)
  - 2002– Bayonne. 5 paintings for the Hudson Bergen Light Rail System, NJ.
  - 2001– Transformations. series of 16 stained glass windows, Connecticut Juvenile Training School, Middletown, CT.
  - 1997-1998- series of stained glass windows hallway installations: Dialogue, Exchange, Cooperative Education, and Rites of Passage. High School of Redirection, NY.
  - 1996– Portraits and Patterns, Public Art for Public Schools, NY.
  - 1992–1993 – Camino De Animales, Public School 5, Manhattan.

== Awards ==
  - Individual Artist Grant, Brooklyn Arts Council.
  - Artist grant from the Manhattan Graphics Center.
  - Clark Hulings Fund 2020 Executive Fellow.
  - Fellowship with The Robert Blackburn Printmaking Workshop.

== Notable works ==
Access & Inequities: I Hear You. Do You See Me? (1999–2020)

Access and Inequities: I Hear You. Do You See Me? is a collection of 35 works, gathered from three interconnected series: Behind Each Window: A Voice, USA -United States of Anxiety, and The Falling Figures. In this collection, which began in 1999 and was displayed in its entirety at the Kentler International Drawing Space in 2020, Holder explores the many concepts of "home" and how inequalities experienced by individuals impact the every day human existence.

Warrior Women Wizards: Mystical Magical Mysteries (1985–2009)

The series Warrior Women Wizards: Mystical Magical Mysteries began in 1985. The series consists of 14 fine art prints on paper that explore the connections and feelings of spirituality and femininity as seen through the eyes and soul of the artist.

== Process and techniques ==
Holder describes her process for making art in an interview with Educurious as such:

“The process of making art is really an adventure. I start with an idea or a feeling or a concept or a relationship with something in the world or something in my family or my surroundings and I explore it.”

Robin works in series which tend to span decades in order to fully explore the different perspectives, eras, and patterns the subjects provide while exhausting her choices of materials and mediums for a specific piece. Just like the layered and complex subject matter on which Holder bases her works, each piece in a series Robin creates is built through layers of printmaking techniques, collage, patterns, hand painted details, words, stencils, paper crafts, and drawings.
