= Robert Kelly (Gaelic footballer) =

Irish Gaelic footballer

Personal information
- Native name: Roibeard Ó Ceallaigh (Irish)

Sport
- Sport: Gaelic football
- Position: Midfield
Club
- Years: Club
- Straffan
Inter-county
- Years: County
- 2009-2013: Kildare
Inter-county titles
- Leinster titles: 0
- All Stars: 0

Robert Kelly is a Gaelic footballer from County Kildare. He plays for the Kildare senior inter-county football team and for his club Straffan GFC.
