= Valerie Maynard =

African-American artist (1937–2022)

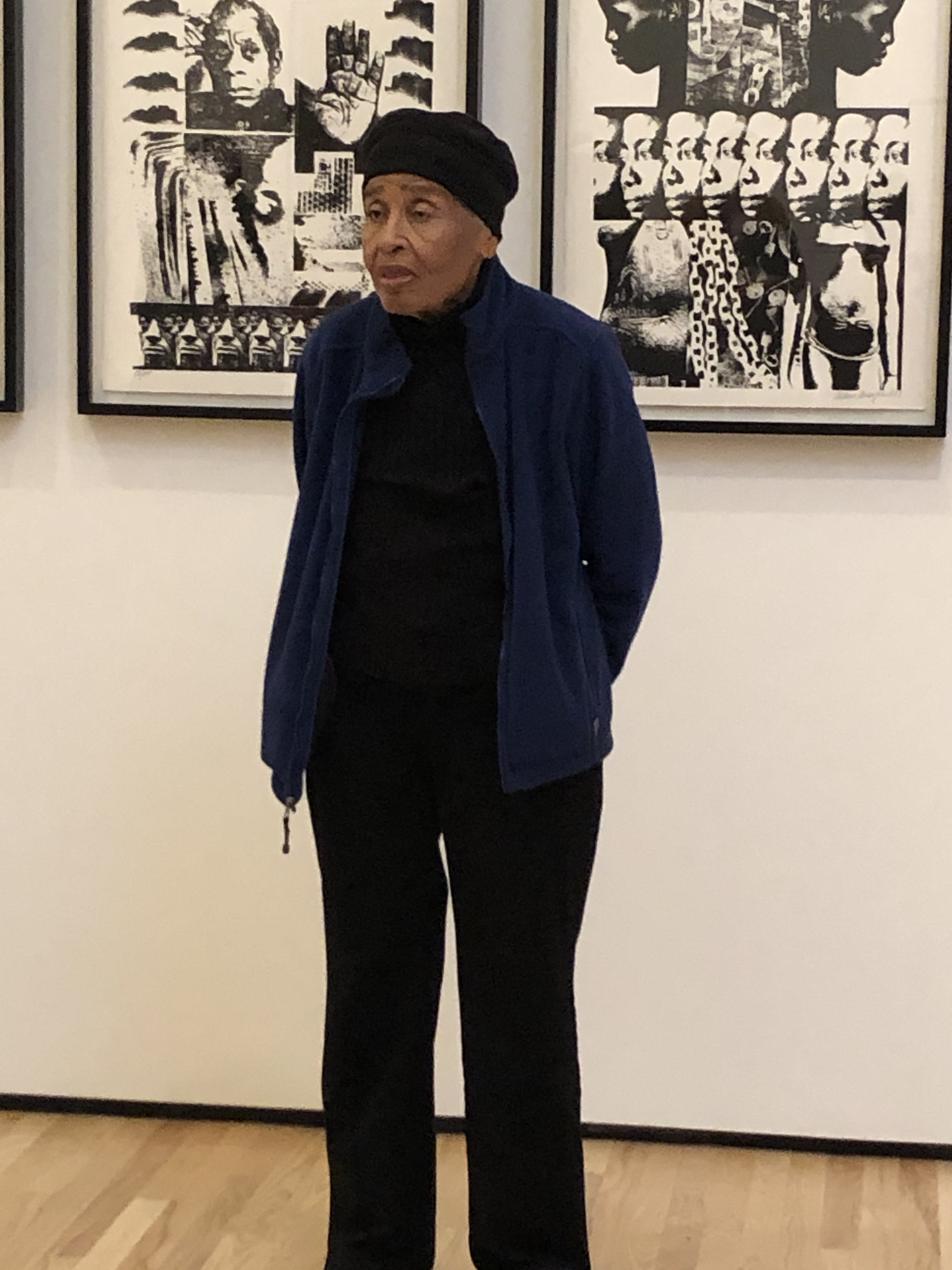
- Maynard at her exhibition "Lost and Found" at the Baltimore Museum of Art, 2020
- Born: Valerie Jean Maynard; August 22, 1937; New York City, U.S.
- Died: September 19, 2022 (aged 85); Baltimore, Maryland, U.S.
- Education: Museum of Modern Art; The New School for Social Research; Goddard College
- Notable work: Polyrhythmics of Consciousness and Light, 2003
- Movement: The Black Arts Movement

Valerie Jean Maynard (August 22, 1937 – September 19, 2022) was an American sculptor, teacher, printmaker, and designer. Maynard's work frequently addressed themes of social inequality and the civil rights movement.

Her work has been exhibited in the United States, Sweden and Lagos, Nigeria. She had been selected for residencies in Pennsylvania, New Hampshire and New York City and received a New York Foundation for the Arts grant in printmaking. Maynard resided in Baltimore, Maryland.

== Early life and education ==
Born in Manhattan on August 22, 1937, to William and Willie Fred (Pratt) Maynard, Valerie Maynard grew up on West 142nd Street. She studied painting and drawing at the Museum of Modern Art, printmaking at the New School for Social Research and received a master's degree in Art/Sculpture in 1977 at Vermont's Goddard College. In 2021, she received an honorary Doctorate of Fine Arts from the Maryland Institute College of Art (MICA).

== Career ==
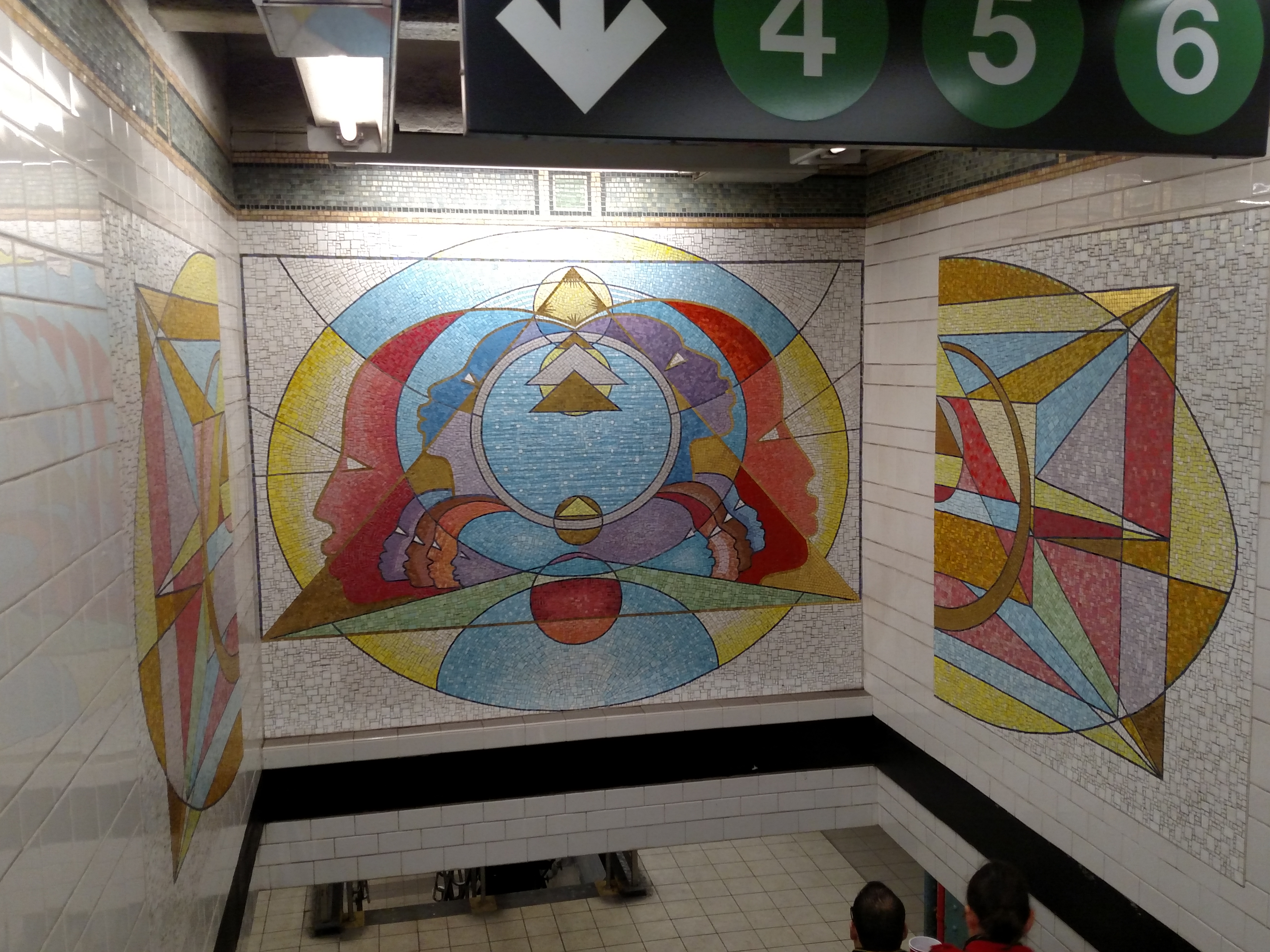
Valerie Maynard's work Polyrhythmics of Consciousness and Light at 125th Street subway station in NYC

Maynard taught at the Studio Museum in Harlem, at Howard University, the University of the Virgin Islands, and the Baltimore School for the Arts. She was artist in residence at both the Rochester Institute of Technology and Massachusetts Institute of Technology.

She also specialized in the preservation and restoration of traditional art by people of color and was a cognitive in the Black Arts Movement.

Maynard was artist-in-residence at The Studio Museum in Harlem where she was a part of a group exhibition Labor, Love, Live Collection in Context, held between November 2007 and March 2008.

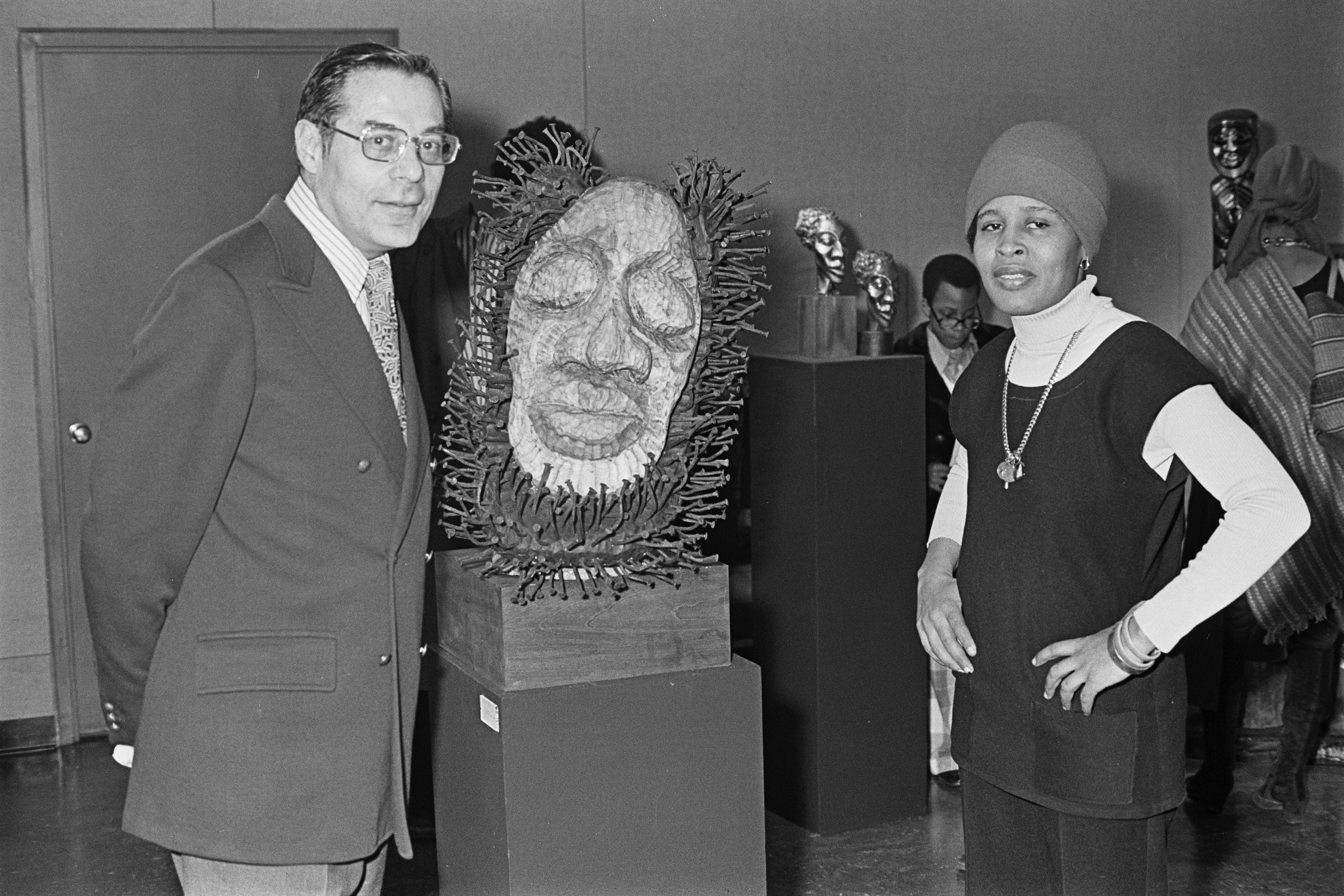
Maynard and Moe Foner stand next to one of her works, March 1, 1973

Maynard's attention to social inequality solidified during the 1960s and 1970s trial of her brother, William Maynard. Mr. Maynard was wrongfully convicted of murder and spent six years in prison before he was vindicated—events drawn upon her sculpture We are Tied to the Very Beginning where Maynard reflects upon the Civil Rights Movements during the 1960s and 1970s. The aesthetics of African identity appear in the construction of the head on the figure and its clenched fist. The head is a prominent part in many of Maynard's figures, and references the distorted quality of African art work made by the Igbo or Yoruba people. The clenched fist was associated with the liberation of African Americans and is considered an indispensable part of the body in many African societies. It "relates the African-American body politic to its cultural and spiritual roots in Africa. Second, it uses this connection to reinforce the Civil Rights struggle of the 1960s and 1970s during which the raised clenched fist salute." By re-contextualizing these motifs present from the Middle Passage to the Civil Rights Movement into her work, Maynard offered commentary on the struggle of those in the African diaspora to achieve and maintain equal rights.

In January 1977, Maynard was part of a contingent of hundreds of African-American artists who represented the North American Zone, exhibiting in FESTAC 77, the Second World Black and African Festival of Arts and Culture in Lagos, Nigeria.

In 2003, Maynard was commissioned by the Metropolitan Transportation Authority to create a series of glass mosaic murals entitled Polyrhythmics of Consciousness and Light. The public art work remains permanently installed in the subway station on 125th Street in New York City.

Karen Berisford Getty examines Maynard's synthesis of African elements in her 2005 Virginia Commonwealth University thesis, "Searching for Transatlantic Freedom: The Art of Valerie Maynard." Maynard was also the subject of a 1975 short documentary called Valerie: A Woman, An Artist, A Philosophy of Life directed by Black female feminist independent filmmaker Monica J. Freeman.

In November 2015, Maynard presented at the Art of Justice: Articulating an Ethos and Aesthetic of the Movement conference at New York University sponsored by the Caribbean Cultural Center African Diaspora Institute in collaboration with the Department of Art and Public Policy, New York University, the Institute of African American Affairs, New York University, and the Institute for Research in African American Studies, Columbia University.

Maynard died from a cardiac arrhythmia at a hospital in Baltimore, Maryland, on September 19, 2022, at the age of 85.

== Solo exhibitions ==
- 1971 American International College, Springfield, Massachusetts
- 1973 Howard University, Washington, D.C.
- 1974 University of Massachusetts, Amherst, Massachusetts
- 1975 Riksutställningar, Stockholm, Sweden (traveling)
- 1983 Reichhold Center for the Arts, University of the Virgin Islands, Saint Thomas
- 1988 New Visions Gallery, Millersville University of Pennsylvania, Lancaster, Pennsylvania
- 1988 Caribbean Cultural Center, New York
- 1989 Hammonds House Museum, Atlanta, Georgia
- 1990 Roadworks, Dorsey Gallery, Brooklyn, New York
- 1991 Towne Art Gallery, Wheelock College, Boston, Massachusetts
- 1992 Compton Gallery, Massachusetts Institute of Technology, Cambridge, Massachusetts
- 1994 Roots Through the Heart, Hartnett Gallery, University of Rochester, Rochester, New York
- 2017 Devotion, New Door Creative, Baltimore, Maryland
- 2020 Lost and Found, Baltimore Museum of Art, Baltimore, Maryland

== Collections ==
Maynard's work is held in the following permanent collections:

- Baltimore Museum of Art, Baltimore
- Bennett College, Greensboro, North Carolina
- Brooklyn Museum, New York
- Memorial Art Gallery, University of Rochester, New York
- National Afro-American Museum and Cultural Center, Wilberforce, Ohio
- National Museum of Mozambique
- National Museum of Nigeria, Lagos
- Riksutställningar, Stockholm, Sweden
- Studio Museum in Harlem, New York
