= Pioneer City =

- The main street of Pioneer City
- Interactive map of Pioneer City
- Location: Davie, Florida, U.S.
- Coordinates: 26.07501°N 80.32383°W
- Status: Defunct
- Opened: May 28, 1966
- Closed: February 1968
- Owner: Myron M. Weiss, Sr.
- Operating season: Year-round
- Area: 200 acres (0.81 km^{2})

Pioneer City was an Old West theme park located across the street from Flamingo Gardens in Davie, Florida.

The park was opened on Memorial Day weekend 1966 by photography studio magnate Myron M. "Mike" Weiss, Sr. as a built-to-scale Dodge City, Kansas, complete with a saloon, general store, Pony Express office, opera house and casino, undertaker, and barber shop, highlighted by cowboy actors who staged gunfights at high noon.

== History ==
Weiss invested $2 million (about $13.5 million in 2010 dollars) to build the park, carving out a 200-acre oak hammock out of the 5,000 acres he owned between Flamingo Road and U.S. 27 in what was then rural southwestern Broward County. Architects and interior designers commissioned by Weiss worked on the park for two years before its opening, carefully examining Civil War era photos to perfect the architecture and design of the Old West.

The railroad station at Pioneer City

Weiss bought a 19th-century steam locomotive in Pennsylvania and two paddle-wheel boats built in Miami, Florida for the park as well as refurbished antique fire engines and a Wells Fargo stagecoach. Gandy dancers laid almost a half-mile of narrow gauge railroad track for a train to carry visitors around the park. Weiss also dredged a lake and a canal for the paddleboats to ferry visitors from the parking lot into the park. In addition, Weiss surrounded the town at the center of the park with an Indian village, a gold mining area, and a petting zoo with pony rides.

== Demise ==
Weiss, however, had no experience managing a theme park, and was unprepared for the heavy operating costs, summer thunderstorms, and difficulties posed by managing large crowds. It rained or threatened to rain 77 of the first 90 days the park was open; the area received 21 inches of rain in June 1966, the first full month the park was open. In addition, the park was located on a two-lane country road seven miles from the Florida Turnpike, the nearest major highway at the time. Faced with mixed box office results and depleted cash operating reserves, the park closed in February 1968.

Most of the park was demolished to make way for the Kapok Tree restaurant and banquet facility, that operated on the site from 1974 to 1990. Today, the land is the site of the county-run Long Key Natural Area and Nature Center. The dredged lake and canal remain, and the railroad right of way still exists as a horse trail. The exhibit hall at the Nature Center contains a promotional poster and several old photos of Pioneer City.
