= Jack White (sculptor) =

American sculptor

John "Jack" H. White (July 6, 1940 – 2017) is an American artist known for his work as a sculptor, fresco painter and photographer.

The Burgess states, "Jack White was an abstract artistic innovator. His career spans over forty years. Although he was widely exhibited as a sculptor, his experimentation in plaster, paint and the traditional medium of fresco has also afforded him the signature label of painter. His themes were concerned with are universal: spirit, energy, matter, physics, and sacred geometry."

== Biography ==
=== Early background ===
Jack White was born in Kings County Hospital Center in Brooklyn, New York. His parents, Rosa Brown and Oscar Cornelius White, were originally from Jamestown and McClellanville, South Carolina, respectively. Rosa and Oscar migrated from South Carolina and settled in the Bedford Stuyvesant neighborhood in Brooklyn, where they raised five children: Jack, his three sisters, and one brother. Rosa was a housewife and Oscar was a general contractor. White attended P.S. 70, P.S. 83 and Junior High 35, graduating from Wingate High School in 1958.

At age eight, White began sketching people on the street of his neighborhood and copying comic characters. He would spend afternoons after school and on the weekend sitting on his stoop diligently creating his own drawings. White purchased "how-to draw' books from art supply stores. His friends and family were impressed with his drawings.

Seeing his interest in drawing, White's sister purchased him a paint set. White received support of his creativity from his father, while his mother, though supportive, hoped that he would pursue a 'real job' in architecture. White's mother felt that since his father was a builder, perhaps he could design buildings that his father would build. Other than a brief stint participating in track in the 100-yard dash, White had little interest in sports. He was very interested in math, drafting and geometry.

In 1956, two nights per week, White was the youngest student at the Cartoons and Illustrators School, today, the School of Visual Arts in New York City. He was interviewed and then tested on his level of talent. White drew a portrait, a head, still life and an interior scene and was accepted.

=== Military service ===
After high school, White enlisted in the United States Army in 1959. White saw this as a means of visiting Europe's Art museums. Army recruiters promised that he could be stationed in Europe if he would join a combat group – the 28th Infantry, which was stationed in Neu Ulm, a town in Bavaria, (Germany), the location of Wiley barracks. After which, White was transferred to Augsburg and finally Munich, Germany. Because White's military service took place between the Korean and Vietnam wars, he never saw active combat, but was trained as a cannoneer, the soldier who serves and fires cannons. While stationed in Augsburg, White qualified for the U.S. Army Rifle Team.

White enjoyed the camaraderie that the military service provided. "Like-minded people developed a clique, so my friends were jazz musicians and artists." When White would be on 'leave', a friend would join him in renting an apartment in Schwabing, a bohemian section of Munich, Germany. White and his friend rented an apartment as they wanted to immerse themselves in the society, never wearing their Army uniform. Also, White knew that to flaunt their Army status might attract those Germans who did not take kindly to the military. White developed friendships with Indians, German students, Spaniards. He spent long hours in the museums of Paris, Amsterdam and Germany.

White encountered racial situations while in Germany, "An officer, who was from the American south would often call me 'boy' instead of 'Private'. And once when I was walking down the street with a German woman, I was confronted by bigoted white soldiers". White's racist experiences in the military were not limited to Europe. "In 1959, when I was in basic training at Fort Jaffey, Arkansas, a buddy and I, while wearing our uniforms, went to an ice cream parlor off base. We were told that we would not be served. My friend was from Chicago and I being from New York weren't having it. After words were exchanged we were chased out of there."

White was also busted in rank from Private First Class to Private for "inefficiency", as he fell asleep while doing double duty during a troop maneuver. When he woke up, his company --- the 28th Infantry, had moved out.

== Artistic experience ==
White was eventually discharged from the Army in Munich, Germany in 1962. Instead of returning to America, he went to Ibiza, Spain because, "Even though I had saved some money, while in the military, I had heard it was the place to go if you did not have a lot of money. Plus because I wanted to get more into my art, it was the place to be for its art scene." While living in Ibiza, I often visited Barcelona and Madrid. Ibiza, opened my life to art. Prior to moving there, I had never heard of any other black artists, that is, until Bob Thompson arrived." White was overwhelmed by Thompson's outgoing personality. Thompson took White under his wing and shared his knowledge of art and his books on African art. Later, Marzette Watts and Bill Barrel arrived. All three became mentors and pointed White in a good artistic direction.

Godfrey, an English Canadian woodcarver, in his early 20s had a huge impact, as he taught White how to carve wood. "It was like falling in love". Woodcarving became fascinating and therapeutic. I began 'direct carving' which means you don't have a plan, but just find the forms in the material you are working with."

White's first sculpture sold for $25.00 in the early fall of 1962. Later he sold four more pieces to jetsetters who frequently visited Ibiza. His pieces were also displayed and sold on consignment in a local gallery. When White's money was depleted, Bob Thompson often invited him to dinner at his home, or in restaurants.

Eventually, White was deported from Ibiza because of his mental collapse. Because of drugs, White was arrested by the police because he banged loudly on the cathedral doors of the, "Alte Villa", (old town), on Christmas morning because it was locked. He was taken to a mental hospital. "I thought I could read minds." Finally, the American consulate contacted my parents and I was placed on a boat and shipped back to New York. But I then got into it with the ship's nurse, when I refused to take a shower, telling her I had just had one in the hospital. Security promptly threw me into a padded cell. I couldn't tell you how long I was on that ship; I never saw the ocean. I was so angry; I ripped up the padded walls".

When the boat reached the New York City port, White was taken to the Staten Island Veterans Administration Hospital. After one week, his mother and sisters stipulated that he was acting normally and signed him out of the hospital.

White continued to work in developing his art and enrolled in the Arts Student League in New York City, learning many art disciplines. John Hovannes, one of his teachers, was a technical genius. "He never tried to lead his students to any one style; just showing us how to get what you wanted from any material you chose to work with", expressed White.

White moved to lower Manhattan, to Forsyth Street. He continued to visit galleries, museums, while working part-time at Double Day Bookstore in the stock room. He also drove a yellow cab and worked in a restaurant. In 1968, his first showing was a group show, organized by a sculptor friend from the Art Student League. From then on, White participated only in group shows as a sculptor. His first one-man show was of his Fresco paintings in 1996.

== Prominent work ==
Deodate Series, (1969); Wing Figures Series (1988–95); Galactic Nascence Series (1997), Galaxy Cluster Series, (2001–2002), Dark Matters and Entropy, (2006) .

== Education ==
- Art Student's League, New York, 1963-6
- Cartooner's and Illustrator's School, (The School of Visual Arts), NYC, 1956–57

== Awards ==
- Fellowship, MacDowell Colony, Peterborough, NH 1967
- Allan B. Tucker Memorial Scholarship, Art Students League, New York 1964

== Solo exhibitions ==
- Peg Alston FIne Arts, New York City
- 2009 Renaissance Fine Art, New York City "Dark Matters and Entropy"
- 2002 Sumei Multidisciplinary Arts Center, Newark, NJ "Retrospective 1994 to 2001
- 2001–02 Peg Alston Fine Arts, New York City "Recent Works”
- 1997–1998 Celebration (Significant Smaller Works), Judith Klein Gallery New York, NY
- 1997 Cosmogenesis, Wilmer Jennings Gallery New York, NY
- 1996 Intimations, Wilmer Jennings Gallery New York, NY

== Significant group exhibitions ==
- 1997 Art from the African Diaspora, Northern Westchester Center for the Arts Mount Kisco, NY
- 1996 Kindred Spirits, Cathedral of St. John the Divine New York, NY
- 1978 A Selection of African-American Sculpture, Cinque Gallery New York, NY
- 1978 Snug Harbor Museum, Staten Island, NY "Artists by the Sea"
- 1971 Group Show, Ivan Spence Gallery Ibiza, Spain
- 1968–1970 30 Contemporary Black Artists, San Francisco Museum of Art San Francisco, CA, Traveling Show, The Minneapolis Institute of Art, High Museum of Art, Flint Institute of Art, Everson
- 1970 Afro-American Artists: New York and Boston, Museum of Fine Arts Boston, MA
- 1969 1969: Twelve Afro-American Artists, Lee Nordness Galleries New York, NY
- 1968 Martin Luther King Memorial Show, Museum of Modern Art New York, NY
- 1968 New Voices: 15 New York Artists, American Greetings Gallery New York, NY
- 1966 Manhattan Counterpoints, Lever House Gallery New York, NY

== Collections ==
- Chase Manhattan Bank, New York
- Carver Federal Savings Bank, New York
- Hatch-Billops Collection, New York
- Kenkeleba House, New York
- Metro Media, New York
- Montclair State University, Montclair, NJ
- Queens College of CUNY, Flushing, NY
- Snug Harbor Museum, Staten Island, NY
- The James E. Lewis Museum of Art, Baltimore, Maryland

== Commissions ==
- Award Sculpture, Malik Yoba Fatherhood Project, N Y, 2002
- Sony Innovators Award, Sculpture for the Sony Corporation, Park Ridge, NJ 1992
- Indoor Sculpture, Mr. And Mrs. Cheney, Cambridge MA 1982
- Outdoor Sculpture, I.S. 206 Bronx, Board of Education, New York 1978

== Catalogues ==
- David C Driskell Center at the University of Maryland, "Tradition Redefined: The Larry and Brenda Thompson Collection of African American Art” 2009
- David C Driskell Center at the University of Maryland, “ Holding Our Own, Selections from, “the Collectors Club of Washington, D. C., Inc.” 2006
- Sumei Multidisciplinary Arts Center, Newark, N J, “ Jack H White Retrospective “, 2002
- Skylight Gallery at Restoration Plaza, Brooklyn, N. Y., "Theosophy N Art" 1996
- Museum of Fine Arts, Boston, Mass., " Afro- American Artists”, New York and Boston 1970
