= Robert Kelly (artist) =

American artist

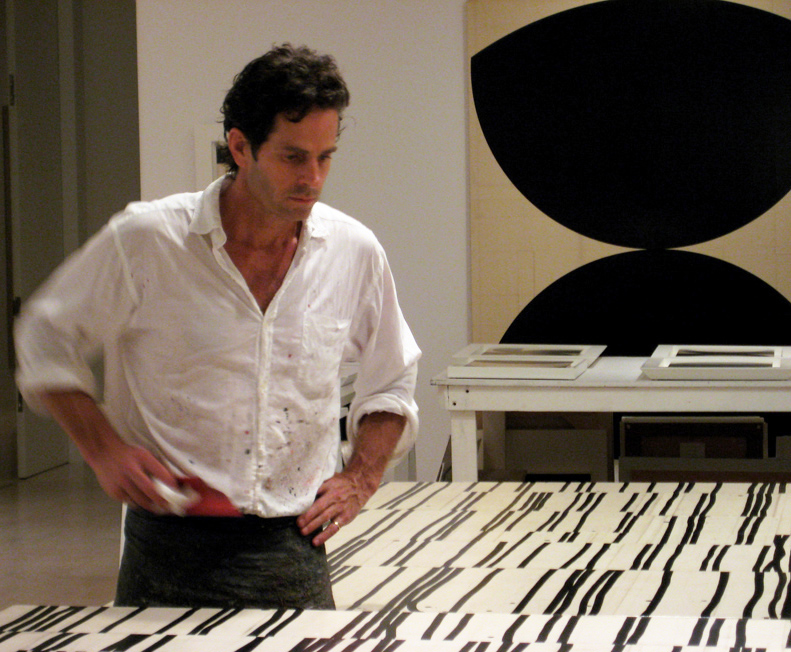
Kelly in his New York studio.

Robert Kelly (born 1956) is an American artist. He is based in New York City.

== Life and work ==
Kelly was born in Santa Fe, New Mexico, and studied at Harvard University, Cambridge, Massachusetts (B.A. 1978).

His paintings have been acquired by public and private collections in Europe and the United States, including The Whitney Museum of American Art, New York, NY; The Brooklyn Museum, Brooklyn, NY; New Mexico Museum of Art, Santa Fe, NM; Milwaukee Art Museum, Milwaukee, WI; Smith College Art Museum, Northampton MA; Jane Voorhees Zimmerli Art Museum, Rutger's University, NJ; Montgomery Museum of Fine Arts, Montgomery; The Fogg Museum, Cambridge, MA; The Margulies Collection, Miami, FL; and the McNay Art Museum, San Antonio, TX.

Kelly has traveled throughout the United States, Europe, North Africa, the Near East, and Nepal. His work often incorporates unusual materials from his journeys, among them vintage posters and printed antique paper, obscured and layered in saturated pigments on a canvas faintly scored with irregular grids. Kelly's paintings have been likened to palimpsests and his method described as one of building "meticulously on inhabited ground, layering materials, documents, and signs, covering them, wiping out their beauty, nearly, but allowing something of the labor and their languages to persist".

== Influences ==
Kelly's influences include the De Stijl movement, Malevich and Mondrian and modernists like Bauhaus, Joaquín Torres-García, Philip Guston, Richard Diebenkorn, Kurt Schwitters, Blinky Palermo and Brazilian Neo-Concretists Lygia Clark and Helio Oiticica.

== Reviews and commentary ==
"Kelly compares his work method to the practice of a stonemason building a wall, setting the components in place as they rise with an astuteness and precision found in the process of composing formal puzzles. Addressing the full expanse of a canvas covered entirely with paper, he masterfully builds up his surface with the pared down tools of line, form and color. Given their remarkable elegance, sheen and tactile qualities, the paintings invite drop-dead awe". Edward Leffingwell, Robert Kelly: Paper Trails

"In these works the sophisticated play between translucency and opacity, representation and abstraction conflates past and present—be it the history of art or of a psyche". Hilarie M. Sheets, Art in America

"[His] process yields the self-sustaining and harmonious 'rightness' of so much of Kelly’s work, a sense that each form could never be other than it is; were it sharper, more obtuse, or thicker, each angle, curve, or horizontal band would collapse into formlessness. Kelly’s compositions are held in such perfect moments of balance...” João Ribas, Robert Kelly: Praxis and Poesis

"The works are paradoxical: by disassembling and then reassembling the pieces, Kelly seems to undermine visual 'completeness' by a fragmented presentation. Yet it nonetheless feels as though the image is a cohesive whole". Melissa Kuntz, Art in America

"Confronted as all artists are now with the exhaustion of subjectivity, Robert Kelly insists on the capacity of painting to mediate subjective apprehension through symbolic forms and sensual experience. Nothing less". Lyle Rexer, Robert Kelly: Painting’s Place

"Robert Kelly’s art is exemplary. It reveals an intelligence that is as alert and modern as one could wish but is at the same time saturated in the knowledge of other times and places". John Ash, Robert Kelly: Painting History
