= Ed Clark (artist) =

American artist (1926–2019)

Edward Clark
- Born: May 6, 1926; New Orleans, Louisiana, U.S.
- Died: October 18, 2019 (aged 93); Detroit, Michigan, U.S.
- Education: The Art Institute of Chicago; Academie de la Grande Chaumière, Paris
- Known for: Painting
- Movement: Abstract expressionism
- Awards: National Endowment for the Arts (1972); The Art Institute of Chicago (2013)

Edward "Ed" Clark (May 6, 1926 – October 18, 2019) was an abstract expressionist painter known for his broad, powerful brushstrokes, radiant colors and large-scale canvases. An African American, his major contributions to modernist painting remained unrecognized until relatively late in his seven-decade career, during which he pioneered the use of shaped canvases and a commercially available push broom to create striking works of art.

== Early life and education ==
Ed Clark was born May 6, 1926, in the Storyville section of New Orleans, Louisiana, to Edward and Merion (Hutchinson) Clark. When he was seven years old, the family moved from Baton Rouge, Louisiana, to Chicago. His father, a habitual gambler, was an unreliable provider. The family, including a younger sister, Shirley, was supported mostly by the mother and relatives. The devoutly religious Merion Clark sent her young son to Roman Catholic grade schools, where the nuns found the boy had a talent for drawing and encouraged him in creating classroom religious art.

In 1944, during World War II, 17-year-old Ed Clark dropped out of high school and joined the U.S. Army Air Forces, serving eventually with an all-black unit in newly recaptured Guam. Leaving the military in 1946 and unprepared for university, he decided to use GI Bill of Rights stipends to enroll in night classes at the School of the Art Institute of Chicago, where he studied under Louis Ritman and Helen Gardner. In 1952, with the veteran’s benefits still available, he moved to Paris to study at the prestigious Académie de la Grande Chaumière under Edouard Goerg.

== Paris ==
The French art mecca enthralled the 26-year-old Clark. "They were all alive, man! Picasso, Braque. … Everybody was there! … Matisse was alive. … And they were like gods then!” he recalled in a 2011 oral history interview, published in 2014. He arrived as a figurative, realist painter but soon shifted into abstraction, influenced in particular by the work of Russian-French painter Nicolas de Staël and his block-like slabs of intense color. Clark would later remark that a realist portrait, for example, no matter how well done, was essentially “a lie,” and “the truth is in the physical brushstroke and the subject of the painting is the paint itself.”

The young Chicagoan joined a Parisian circle of expatriate black American artists escaping U.S. racism, including writer James Baldwin and painter Beauford Delaney, and also grew friendly with such white artists as Joan Mitchell, Sam Francis and Al Held. After his GI benefits ran out, and while working to sell his art, he subsisted on a grandmother’s bequest and the support of friends. In 1955, he was given his first solo exhibition, at Paris’s Gallerie Creuze.

== New York ==
Encouraged by George Sugarman, an artist friend who had left Paris for his native New York, Clark returned to the United States in 1956. A year later he co-founded with Sugarman and other artists the cooperative Brata Gallery in Manhattan's East Village. He also took on work elsewhere as a gallery assistant.

During this period, black painters were routinely ignored by the New York art establishment.“I couldn’t get into a commercial gallery where a white person was running it," Clark recalled in the oral history. "A lot of the spaces I was showing in … I rented out the spaces!"

== Technique and innovation ==
Clark hit upon his signature technique in the mid-1950s in Paris, when striving to cover a larger area of canvas with broader, straighter strokes than possible with his wrist and conventional paintbrushes. He picked up a janitor's push broom. Especially later when he placed the canvas on the floor, the broom in Clark’s hands spread color in wide, often horizontal swaths that spoke of energy and speed. He called it his “big sweep.” From oils in his early years, he moved on to brilliant acrylics on large canvases, and softer, quieter dry pigments on paper. Though abstract, the compositions could sometimes suggest ethereal landscapes, even human forms. He had his signature colors as well. Pink "is to him what orange was to Cezanne and yellow to Van Gogh," wrote art critic April Kingsley.

In 1957, Clark even broke the bounds of the canvas, extending a piece of painted surface beyond the rectangular frame. Then, in a bold innovation in the late 1960s, he began experimenting with oval-shaped canvases, which he explained better matched the human field of vision.

Over several decades, the artist traveled widely, visiting destinations such as Nigeria, New Mexico, Cuba, China, and Paris. These travels influenced the artist's exploration of light and color in his work.

== Recognition, critical response ==
In his early decades in Paris and New York, Ed Clark emerged as an “artists’ artist,” much admired by his peers but not widely known. Wider recognition began in the 1980s, when an ARTnews critique marveled at his “amazing expressivity,” and art historian Corinne Robins pronounced him a “major American modernist.” It wasn’t until the 21st century, however, particularly after a survey exhibition at the Art Institute of Chicago in 2013, that he was recognized as a leading figure in the “second generation” of abstract expressionists. He was presented that year with the Art Institute of Chicago's Legends and Legacy Award, in recognition of what it called his "pioneering paintings."

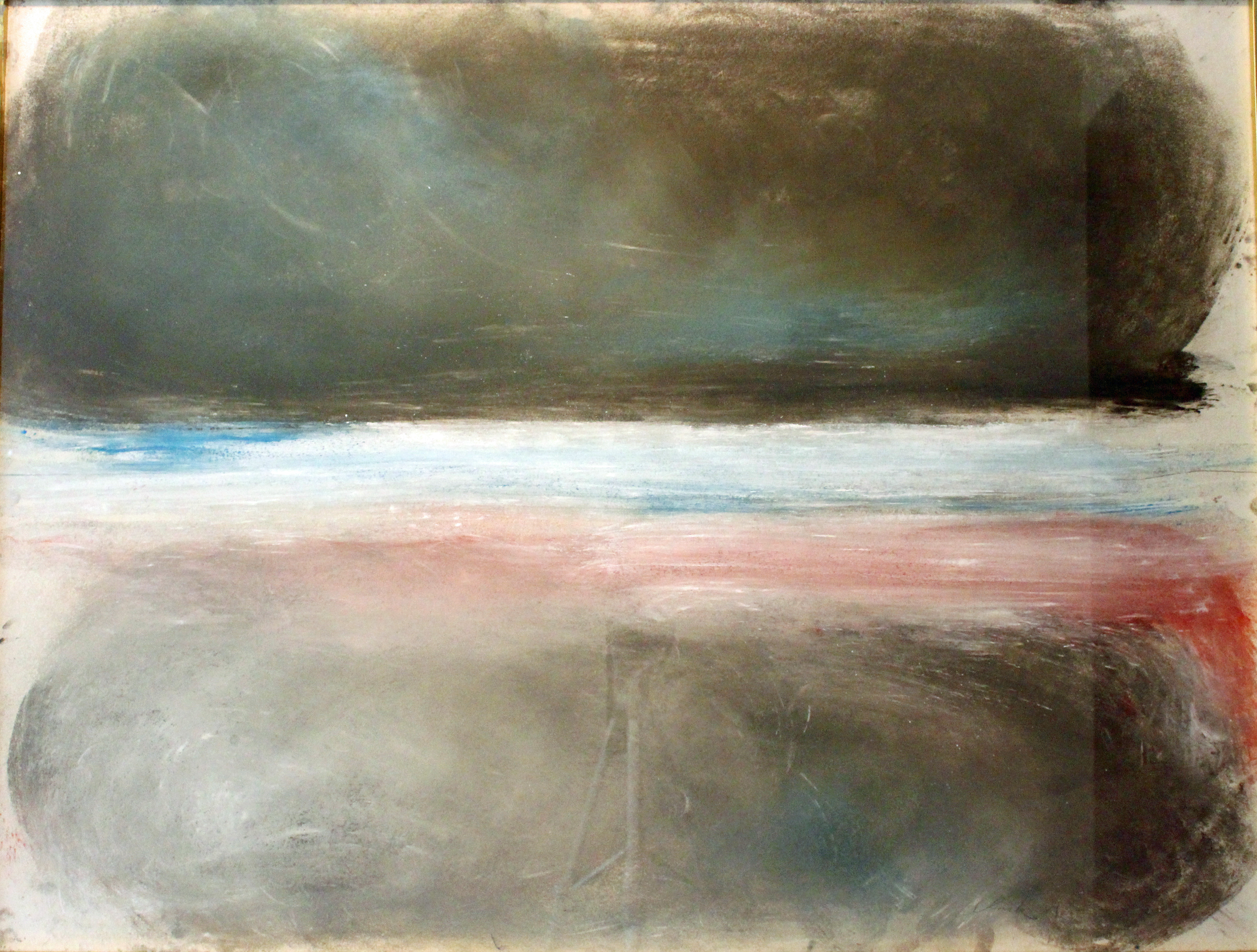
Untitled (1981), dry pigment on paper from Ed Clark's "Taos series," illustrative of his signature push broom technique, 49 x 37 inches (124 x 94 cm)(Private Collection)

In 2014, upon viewing an exhibit of Clark's work at the Tilton Gallery, New York critic Barry Schwabsky wrote in The Nation, "He is, simply, one of the best living painters." He continued, "Paint as a literal, physical presence and as a trace of the artist's mental and physical activity becomes inseparable from the evocation of the glory of light." Reviewing a Museum of Modern Art show in 2017, New York Times critic Roberta Smith wrote that in a gallery that also included paintings by Willem de Kooning, Elizabeth Murray, Alma Thomas and others, she was most taken by "an effortless, thrilling abstraction full of floating light," an untitled work by Clark.

Of one of the final shows of Clark’s lifetime, at New York’s Mnuchin Gallery in 2018, writer-curator Antwaun Sargent concluded: “Over nearly seven decades of experimenting with the color and energy of paint by sweeping it powerfully across canvas, Clark has extended the very possibilities of the medium and significantly shaped the history of abstraction."

Although his work was sometimes exhibited in group shows of African-American art, Clark disliked the notion of "black art". In his 2011 oral history he told interviewer Jack Whitten: "I never liked that. 'Black Art,' like we're different. Different creatures. It sounds kind of racist to me."

Beginning in 2019, Clark's work was represented worldwide by the Swiss gallery Hauser & Wirth.

In 2021, Clark's work was featured in Polyphonic: Celebrating PAMM's Fund for African American Art, a group show at Pérez Art Museum Miami highlighting artists in the museum collection acquired through the PAMM Fund for African American Art, an initiative created in 2013.

== Personal life ==
Clark’s four marriages – to Muriel Nelson, Lola Owens, Hedy Durham and Liping An – ended in divorce. He and Durham had a daughter, Melanca Clark, his only child. Clark candidly told interviewer Whitten of his liaisons with numerous women: “Women always have liked me. Pretty women.” A New York Times interviewer in 2014 described the painter as "a force of nature, vital and charming, witty and profane".

== Museums and collections ==
Ed Clark's paintings are included in the permanent collections of The Art Institute of Chicago; the Detroit Institute of Arts; the Studio Museum in Harlem, New York; the Metropolitan Museum of Art, New York; the Museum of Modern Art, New York; the Smithsonian National Museum of African American History and Culture, Washington, D.C.; the California Afro-American Museum, Los Angeles; the Kresge Art Museum at Michigan State University, East Lansing, Michigan; the James E. Lewis Museum of Art at Morgan State University, Baltimore; the Museum of Modern Art in Salvador, Bahia, Brazil; the Centro de Arte Moderno in Guadalajara, Mexico; The John and Mable Ringling Museum of Art, Sarasota, Florida; the Albright-Knox Art Gallery, Buffalo, New York; the Brooklyn Museum, Brooklyn, New York; the Dallas Museum of Art; the Hammer Museum, Los Angeles; the Newark Museum, Newark, New Jersey; the Pérez Art Museum Miami, Florida, acquired through the PAMM Fund for African American Art; the Saint Louis Art Museum; the Whitney Museum of American Art, New York, among others.

== Books ==
- Kenkeleba Gallery (New York, N.Y.), The search for freedom : African American abstract painting 1945–1975 : May 19 – July 14, 1991, Kenkeleba Gallery, New York.
- Asake Bomani and Belvie Rooks, ‘’The Paris connections : African American artists in Paris’’ ISBN 0-936609-25-7
- Marika Herskovic, American abstract expressionism of the 1950s : an illustrated survey : with artists' statements, artwork and biographies ISBN 0-9677994-1-4. p. 78–81
