= 1953 in the Soviet Union =

- Decades: 1930s; 1940s; 1950s; 1960s; 1970s
- See also: History of the Soviet Union; List of years in the Soviet Union

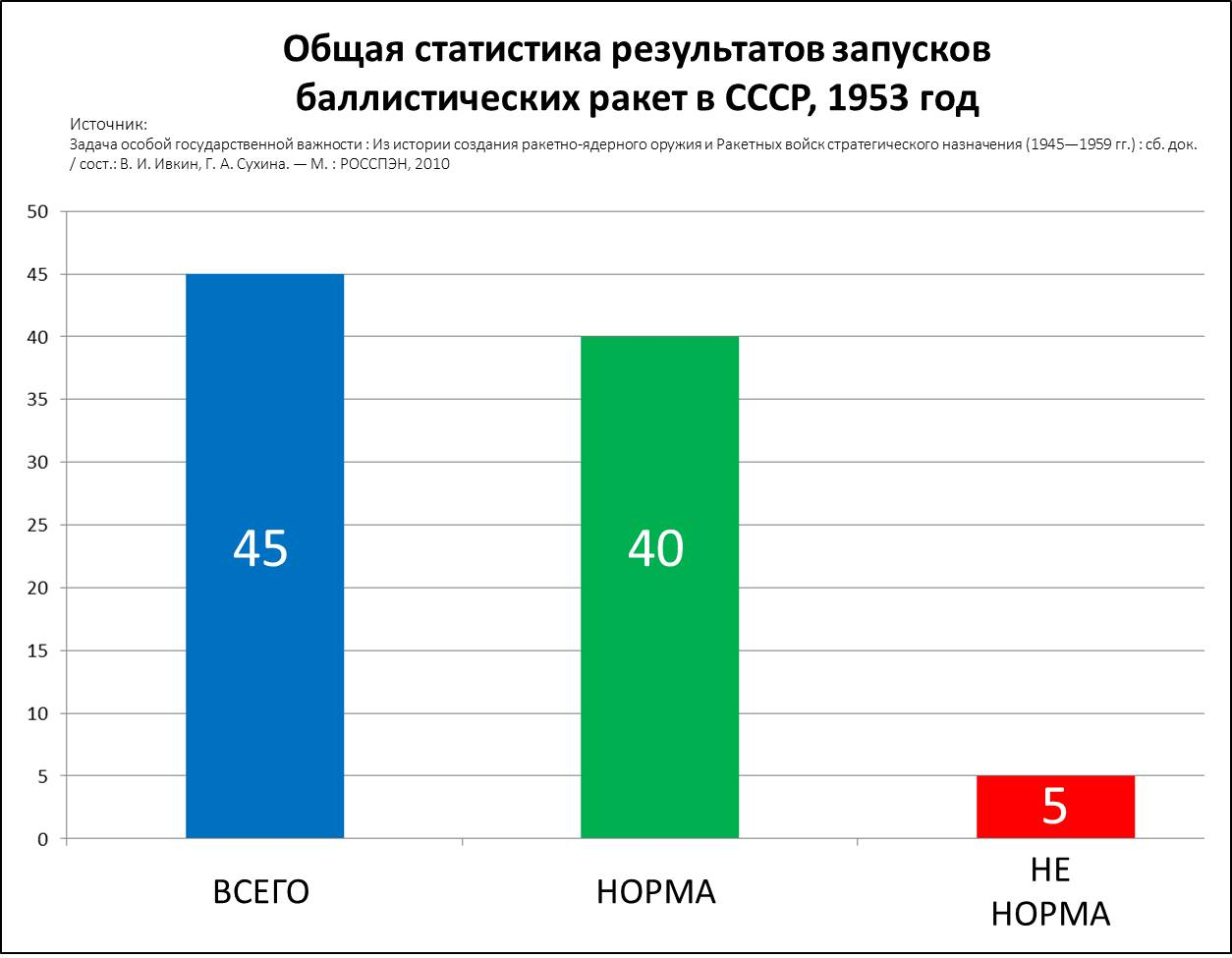
Amount of Ballistic missile launches by the Soviet Union in 1953

The following lists events that happened during 1953 in the Union of Soviet Socialist Republics.

== Incumbents ==
- First Secretary of the Communist Party of the Soviet Union — Nikita Khrushchev (starting 14 September)
- Chairman of the Presidium of the Supreme Soviet of the Soviet Union — Nikolay Shvernik (until 19 March), Kliment Voroshilov (starting 19 March)
- Chairman of the Council of Ministers of the Soviet Union — Joseph Stalin (until 5 March), Georgy Malenkov (starting 6 March)

== Events ==
- Doctors' plot

=== March ===
- March 5 — Joseph Stalin dies, starting a power struggle among Soviet leadership.

=== May ===
- May 26 – August 4 — Norilsk uprising

=== July ===
- July 19 – August 1 — Vorkuta uprising

=== August ===
- August 12 — Joe 4, the first Soviet test of a thermonuclear weapon occurs.
- August 23 — RDS-4 is first tested.

== Births ==
- January 3 — Ali Masimli, Acting Prime Minister of Azerbaijan
- January 5 — Vassily Solomin, boxer and Olympian (d. 1997)
- January 21 — Larisa Shoigu, Russian politician (d. 2021)
- January 23 — Pavlo Lazarenko, 5th Prime Minister of Ukraine
- January 31
  - Sergei Ivanov, 5th Minister of Defence of Russia
  - Aron Atabek, Kazakh writer and dissident (d. 2021)
- February 13 — Sergei Kapustin, ice hockey player (d. 1995)
- February 14 — Sergey Mironov, 3rd Chairman of the Federation Council of Russia
- February 24 — Georgy Poltavchenko, 3rd Governor of Saint Petersburg
- March 13 — Boris Zolotaryov, 2nd Governor of Evenk Autonomous Okrug
- April 8 — Alexander Berdnikov, 5th Head of the Altai Republic
- April 29 — Nikolai Budarin, Russian cosmonaut
- May 2 — Valery Gergiev, Russian conductor and opera company director
- May 3 — Salman Hashimikov, Soviet and Russian heavyweight wrestler
- May 6 — Aleksandr Akimov, engineer (d. 1986)
- May 9 — Valery Zubov, 2nd Governor of Krasnoyarsk Krai (d. 2016)
- May 17 — Kassym-Jomart Tokayev, 2nd President of Kazakhstan
- May 23 — Vyacheslav Shtyrov, 2nd Head of the Sakha Republic
- May 27 — Viktor Tolokonsky, 6th Governor of Krasnoyarsk Krai
- May 29 — Aleksandr Abdulov, Soviet and Russian film and stage actor (d. 2008)
- June 23 — Armen Sarkissian, 4th President of Armenia
- June 24 — Ivo Lill, Estonian glass artist (d. 2019)
- June 29 — Ivan Malakhov, 4th Governor of Sakhalin Oblast
- July 19 — Zinovia Dushkova, Russian author
- July 28 — Vladimir Rushailo, 4th Minister of Internal Affairs of the Russian Federation
- August 17 — Myktybek Abdyldayev, 10th Speaker of the Supreme Council of Kyrgyzstan
- September 23 — Alexey Maslov, 2nd Commander-in-Chief of the Russian Ground Forces (d. 2022)
- October 7 — Andrey Soloviev, war photographer (d. 1993)
- October 22 — Akaki Asatiani, 2nd Chairman of the Supreme Council of Georgia
- November 2 — Sergey Levchenko, 7th Governor of Irkutsk Oblast
- November 16 — Aleksandr Prokopenko, football player (d. 1989)
- November 27
  - Boris Grebenshchikov, Soviet and Russian rock musician
  - Aleksandr Torshin, Russian politician
- December 18 — Khas-Magomed Hadjimuradov, Chechen bard
- December 30 — Oleksandr Sviatotskyi, Ukrainian jurist

== Deaths ==
- January 1 — Maksim Purkayev, military leader (b. 1894)
- February 13 — Lev Mekhlis, 9th Minister of State Control of the Soviet Union (b. 1889)
- March 5
  - Joseph Stalin, 2nd Leader of the Soviet Union (b. 1878)
  - Sergei Prokofiev, composer (b. 1891)
- March 23 — Oskar Luts, writer and playwright (b. 1887)
- May 4 — Nikolai Cholodny, microbiologist (b. 1882)
- May 31 — Vladimir Tatlin, painter and architect (b. 1885)
- June 30 — Vsevolod Pudovkin, film director, screenwriter and actor (b. 1893)
- July 31 — Nikolay Zelinsky, chemist (b. 1861)
- August 1 — Jānis Mendriks, Roman Catholic priest (b. 1907)
- August 30 — Elena Rozmirovich, revolutionary and politician (b. 1886)
- October 6 — Vera Mukhina, sculptor and painter (b. 1889)
- November 8
  - Ivan Alekseyevich Bunin, writer (b. 1870)
  - Zoya Rozhdestvenskaya, singer (b. 1906)
- December 23
  - Lavrentiy Beria, 3rd People's Commissar for Internal Affairs of the Soviet Union (b. 1899)
  - Vsevolod Merkulov, 10th Minister of State Control of the Soviet Union (b. 1895)
  - Bogdan Kobulov, senior member of Soviet security and police apparatus (b. 1904)

== See also ==
- 1953 in fine arts of the Soviet Union
- List of Soviet films of 1953
