= 1953 in art =

Events from the year 1953 in art.

== Events ==
- November – New building for Yale University Art Gallery, New Haven, Connecticut, the first major commission for Louis Kahn, opens.
- Anthony Blunt's Art and Architecture in France 1500–1700 is published.
- Yves Klein becomes a master at judo, receiving the rank of yodan (4th dan/degree black-belt) from the Kodokan in Japan.

== Awards ==
- Archibald Prize: Ivor Hele – Sir Henry Simpson Newland, CBE, DSO, MS, FRCS

== Works ==
- Hans Arp – Cloud Shepherd (sculpture, University City of Caracas)
- Francis Bacon
  - Study after Velázquez's Portrait of Pope Innocent X
  - Two Figures (1953)
- John Brack
  - Men's Wear
  - The New House
- Alberto Burri - Rosso Gobbo
- Alexander Calder – Acoustic Clouds (installation, University City of Caracas)
- José Manuel Capuletti - Dama en la Playa
- Edwin Dickinson – Ruin at Daphne (begun 1943; Metropolitan Museum of Art)
- Dong Xiwen – The Founding Ceremony of the Nation (original version)
- Jacob Epstein – Social Consciousness (sculpture group, Philadelphia)
- M. C. Escher – Relativity (lithograph)
- Barbara Hepworth – Hieroglyph (sculpture)
- Edward Hopper – Office in a Small City (Metropolitan Museum of Art)
- Willem de Kooning – Woman III
- Norman Lewis - Migrating Birds
- L. S. Lowry
  - Football Ground (Going to the Match)
  - Industrial Landscape
  - The Procession passing the Queen Victoria Memorial, Coronation
- René Magritte – Golconda
- Marino Marini – Horse and Rider (bronze)
- Henri Matisse – The Snail (colored paper collage)
- Roberto Matta – Cercle du Blé (Circle of Wheat) (Museum of Fine Arts, Boston)
- Milton Menasco – 'La Troienne' and Her Foals: Eighteen Vignettes and One Painting Together in One Frame for John Whitney
- Henry Moore – Draped Reclining Figure (bronze)
- Alexander Phimister Proctor – John McLoughlin (bronze)
- Jackson Pollock – Portrait and a Dream
- Larry Rivers – Washington Crossing the Delaware
- Mark Rothko – No. 61 (Rust and Blue)
- Alexander Nikolayevich Samokhvalov – In the Sun
- Charles Sheeler – Ore Into Iron (Museum of Fine Arts, Boston)

== Exhibitions ==
- October – Robert Rauschenberg's White Paintings are exhibited at Eleanor Ward's Stable Gallery in New York City.

== Births ==
- January 7 – Robert Longo, American painter and sculptor
- January 9 – Javad Alizadeh, Iranian cartoonist and painter
- February 23 – Walter Wick, American photographer (I Spy)
- February 25 – Martin Kippenberger, German artist (d. 1997)
- April 24 – Eric Bogosian, American performance artist
- May 18 – Helen Chadwick, English conceptual artist (d. 1996)
- September 12 – Stephen Sprouse, American fashion designer and artist (d. 2004)
- November 29 – Alex Grey, American psychedelic artist and author
- undated
  - Steven Campbell, Scottish figurative painter (d. 2007)
  - Michael Kenna, English landscape photographer
  - Kevin O'Neill, English comic book illustrator
  - Marjetica Potrč, Slovenian artist and architect

== Deaths ==
- February 1 – Archibald Nicoll, New Zealand painter (b. 1886)
- February 12 – Uroš Predić, Serbian Realist painter (b. 1857)
- March 23 – Raoul Dufy, French Fauvist painter (b. 1877)
- March 26 – Đorđe Jovanović, Serbian sculptor (b. 1861)
- April 15 – Charles R. Knight, American animal painter (b. 1874)
- April 29
  - Moïse Kisling, Polish-born painter (b. 1891)
  - Alice Prin ("Kiki de Montparnasse"), French artist, model and entertainer (b. 1901)
- June 23 – Albert Gleizes, French painter (b. 1881)
- September 13 – Mary Brewster Hazelton, American portrait painter (b. 1868)
- September 26 – Xu Beihong, Chinese painter (b. 1895)
- October 2 – John Marin, American modernist painter (b. 1870)
- October 6 – Vera Mukhina, Latvian-born Soviet sculptor (b. 1889)
- October 11 – James Earle Fraser, American sculptor (b. 1876)
- October 21 – Sir Muirhead Bone, British etcher (b. 1876)
- November 30 – Francis Picabia, French painter and poet (b. 1879)
- date unknown – J. Laurie Wallace, Irish American painter (b.1864)

== See also ==
- 1953 in fine arts of the Soviet Union
