= The Cello Player =

Painting by Edwin Dickinson

The Cello Player is a painting by the American artist Edwin Dickinson (1891–1978). Painted in oils on a canvas measuring 60 x 48 1/2 inches, it was begun in 1924 and finished in 1926. In 1988 it was purchased by the Fine Arts Museums of San Francisco.

== History ==
The fourth of Dickinson's paintings that art historian John Driscoll identified as major and symbolical, The Cello Player (1924–1926) took the longest to paint of works to that date. Again, the dominant figure is an old man, here posed for by a different model, ostensibly playing a cello in a room littered with objects and seen from above, so that the space tips up to a horizon well above the picture top. The progressive tipping and enclosure of space can be observed in the sequence of works leading up to this one, a strategy that tends to equalize the parts of the picture and enhance their pictorial interaction. But although this parallels modernist tendencies toward pictorial abstraction accompanied by spatial flattening, the figure and objects in this picture give up none of their volume or tactile presence as objects.

== Analysis ==
Sheet music from a Beethoven quartet leads us into the picture and, with the two keyboard instruments at the right, suggests again the equation of painting and music, a notion widely accepted among Provincetown artists, as well as members of Steiglitz's circle, in particular Marsden Hartley. That the music in the picture is purely visual is once again indicated by the picture's undermined narrative coherence, with objects positioned not for use but to create visual rhythms and harmonies, and more explicitly by preventing the cellist from playing. The hand that would finger the notes is not in position and the bow hand has no bow to play with. Further, the music is for a string quartet, but only one string instrument is present and the cellist's position prevents the piano, not a stringed instrument in any case, from being played.

But the formal character of the painting does not mean that the objects have no meaning. Dickinson himself admitted that many of them represented his interests at the time, including a book on the Arctic explorer Fridtjof Nansen, and Driscoll notes that a teapot on the right was one given to Dickinson by a Southern woman who told him that General Sherman had once used it. Moreover, Driscoll believes the meanings go deeper. Specifically, he sees the painting as a tribute to Beethoven, the composer he honored above all others, and, through him, to his deceased brother Burgess, pianist and composer, whom his fellow students at Yale had nicknamed "Beethoven." He observes that the score that Dickinson chose to depict, flanked on the right by a corner of music from Mozart's "Marriage of Figaro," was the string quartet in which Beethoven displays his greatest indebtedness to Mozart. Driscoll argues that Dickinson intended thereby to express his lasting gratitude to his brother, whom he deeply admired, just as Beethoven showed his admiration for Mozart in the depicted score. But such a reading equates Burgess with Mozart, the teacher, and Dickinson with Beethoven, his student, although, as Driscoll points out, it was Burgess who was called Beethoven by school mates, friends, and colleagues. A different reading, one that supports Driscoll's basic conclusion but identifies Burgess as Beethoven, turns on the question of why Dickinson chose to depict the second violin part to represent the quartet, given the fact that without the melody of the first violin something essential is missing. The choice confirms his intention to express his indebtedness to his brother by suggesting that he played second fiddle to Burgess's Beethoven.

Ward connects this and other roses in Dickinson's paintings with a note that Dickinson wrote in the margin of his journal from 1970 next to the name of Alie Mörling: "The rose when Burgess died." He believes that Alie may have given Edwin a rose on that occasion and that the smell and sight of roses may have recalled that event to him and caused its association in his mind with the kindness and beauty of women. He believes that by this time Dickinson was probably familiar with Proust's description of taste and smell awakening recollections of the past.

Dickinson may have turned down the head of the cellist to contribute to the effect of a view from an elevated position, as well as the eliminate the gaze, which would overemphasize the head and weaken the effect of allover visual flow. But it also suggests that the cellist is dreaming, which contributes to the idea of recollection. Dickinson records having had dreams numerous times in his journals, and on 13 March 1925, while painting The Cello Player, he wrote "Dreamed of Burg[ess]." In his painting Villa and Alice, 1941, the woman appears quite clearly to be dreaming. Further, in the three large studio paintings following The Cello Player (The Fossil Hunters, Woodland Scene, and Composition with Still Life) the world that Dickinson creates has become so difficult to reconcile with waking experience that the paintings demand to be seen as dreams or visions.
