= Ephraim Rubenstein =

American painter

- Born: 1956 (age 69–70); Brooklyn, New York, USA
- Education: Columbia University (BA, MFA)
- Occupation: Artist
- Website: https://ephraimrubenstein.com/

Ephraim Rubenstein (born 1956, Brooklyn, NY) is a noted American representational painter and teacher.

== Early life and training ==
Rubenstein was born to Seth Rubenstein, a Brooklyn-based trusts and estates lawyer. His grandfather, E. Ivan Rubenstein, was a judge on the Brooklyn Supreme Court.

Rubenstein often credits his grandfather as one of his earliest artistic influences. Freedman was a commercial artist, and Rubenstein has written about how meaningful it was to watch him work in his studio as a child. The objects his grandfather left behind—especially those connected to wartime experiences—later became the basis for still-life paintings that explore memory, trauma, and family history.

Teaching has also played a big role in Rubenstein’s life. He taught at the University of Richmond for more than a decade, where he earned the Distinguished Educator Award and the Outstanding Faculty Award from the Commonwealth of Virginia. He has also taught at institutions like RISD, MICA, and the National Academy of Design. Today, he teaches drawing and artistic anatomy at the Art Students League of New York and leads drawing classes for first-year medical students in Columbia University’s Narrative Medicine program.

Rubenstein began studying art privately in the painting group of David Levine and Aaron Shikler, as well as in the studio of Andrew Reiss. In 1977–78 he won a Brooklyn Arts and Cultural Association (BACA) high school scholarship to the Brooklyn Museum Art School, where he studied with Francis Cunningham. He graduated from Columbia University with a BA in Art History, in 1978, and from Columbia University School of the Arts with a MF.A. in Painting, in 1986. From 1987 to 1998, he taught as an Associate Professor of Art at the University of Richmond for more than a decade, where he received the "Distinguished Educator Award and the Outstanding Faculty Award" from the Commonwealth of Virginia, the Rhode Island School of Design and the Maryland Institute College of Art. He subsequently studied at the Art Students League of New York with Robert Beverly Hale and Francis Cunningham, and at the National Academy of Design school with Harvey Dinnerstein.

Rubenstein has received several honors throughout his career, including the Emil and Dines Carlsen Prize from the National Academy of Design. His work appears in major collections, most notably the Metropolitan Museum of Art, as well as in corporate art collections like Exxon and Deloitte & Touche. Some of his paintings have also been featured in the U.S. State Department’s Art in Embassies program, where they were shown in countries such as Turkey, Uzbekistan, and Indonesia.

From 1986 to 1997, he showed at Tibor de Nagy Gallery, where he had seven solo exhibitions. He exhibited subsequently at Tatistcheff & Co and George Billis Gallery in Chelsea. He has exhibited internationally, with numerous works exhibited as part of the US State Department's Art in Embassies Program. Rubenstein is a frequent contributor to American Artist, American Artist Drawing and The Artist's Magazine.

One major part of Rubenstein’s career is his long-running series of still-life paintings that revolve around books. He talks about books almost like they’re living objects, and he uses them to explore ideas about memory and personal identity. In pieces such as Self-Portrait with Books, which is in the Metropolitan Museum of Art, he arranges books in ways that mirror aspects of himself. He also paints books that are aged, burnt, or falling apart, using them as metaphors for history, loss, and the passage of time. Rubenstein's style of art is dynamic; always changing or progressing. Unlike an orthodox artist, he doesn't only work in oils, he also creates mixed-media drawings of architectural ruins and sacred spaces. He uses materials like pastel, ink, graphite, and wax-resist techniques to build up layered textures that capture the atmosphere of ancient buildings. He explains that he chooses his materials based on the emotional weight of each subject, which is why some pieces look loose and expressive while others are more detailed and structured.

Rubenstein has been an influential teacher. From 1987 to 1998, he taught at University of Richmond, then at the Rhode Island School of Design, the Maryland Institute College of Art, and the National Academy of Design School.

Today he teaches at the Art Students League of New York, and Columbia University, Department of Narrative Medicine.He also leads drawing classes for first-year medical students in Columbia University’s Narrative Medicine program.

He is represented by Maurine Littleton Gallery.

== Books ==
"Ephraim Rubenstein: Painting from Observation," in Art Students League of New York on painting: lessons and meditations on mediums, styles, and methods. Watson Guptill Publications. 2015. ISBN 9780385345439.

== Collections ==
His painting, Self-portrait with Books, is in The Metropolitan Museum of Art.
