= Sasha Anawalt =

American educator and dance critic (born 1956)

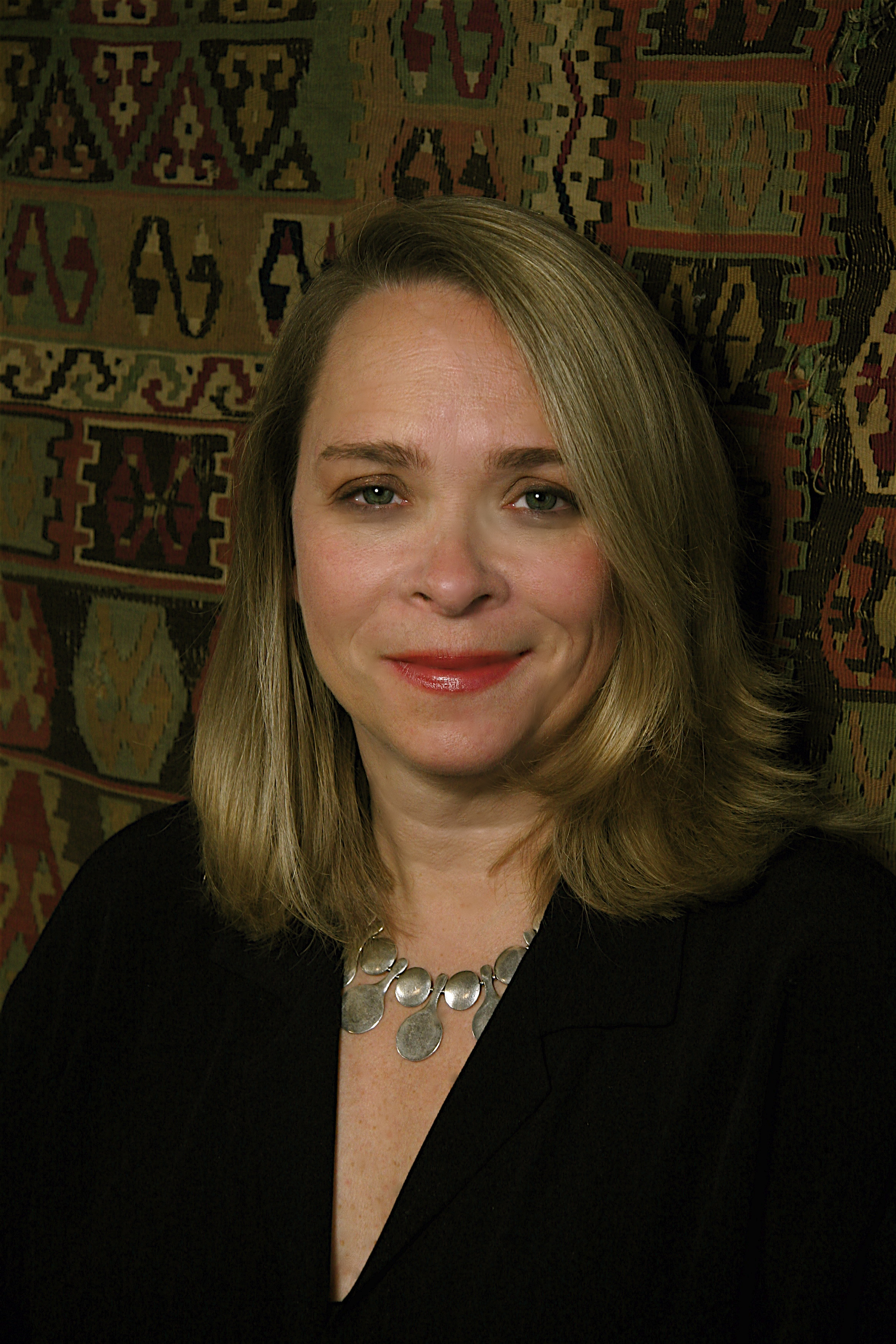
- Sasha Anawalt
- Born: Marcia Evelyn Cunningham; 1956 (age 69–70)
- Education: Barnard College
- Occupations: Arts journalist; professor; critic; author

Sasha Anawalt (born 1956), born Marcia Evelyn Cunningham, is an American educator, dance critic and former journalist who founded several arts journalism programs at USC Annenberg School for Communication and Journalism in Los Angeles, including a master's degree program in arts journalism (2008). She is author of The Joffrey Ballet: Robert Joffrey and the Making of an American Dance Company.

== Early life ==
Born in 1956, Marcia "Sasha" Cunningham grew up the daughter of a painter and arts school founder, Francis Cunningham, and a dance critic and librarian, Kitty Cunningham. She attended Brearley School and graduated from St. Paul's School in Concord, New Hampshire and Barnard College. In 1980, she married William Anawalt.

== Career ==
Anawalt wrote about dance, theater and television for publications including The New York Times, National Public Radio's affiliate in Santa Monica, KCRW as well as for the L.A. Weekly and the SoHo Weekly News.

In 1996, her cultural biography The Joffrey Ballet: Robert Joffrey and the Making of an American Dance Company was published by Scribner. The highly anecdotal book took her nearly six years to write. Kirkus Reviews called it "an intelligent, fair, fascinating portrait of a seminal figure in American ballet", praising Anawalt's writing: "Unusual among dance critics, she never hides behind a professional dance vocabulary. She also ventures worthwhile observations on contextual issues, such as the uncomfortable coupling of dance with business in this country and the politics of American arts funding". Publishers Weekly also positively reviewed the book. Allan Ulrich of The San Francisco Examiner called it "an absorbing in-depth study of the company". Jack Anderson of the New York Times wrote that it was "a book remarkable for its warmth and vigor, and for its blending of candor and judiciousness" and that Anawalt's "appraisal of Joffrey's directorial philosophy is shrewd indeed".

The book inspired a feature-length documentary film by Bob Hercules, Joffrey: Mavericks of American Dance (2012), which aired on PBS' American Masters.

Anawalt joined USC Annenberg School for Communication and Journalism and served as Founding Director of USC's Getty Arts Journalism Program, an arts journalism fellowship program that immersed journalists in the Los Angeles arts scene. Anawalt is director of the master in arts journalism program at USC Annenberg.

In 2009, Anawalt resigned from the Pasadena, California Arts and Culture Commission after the commission refused to display two pieces of public art "after complaints by residents and preservationists that the works were too big for the space," according to a New York Times article. Anawalt served on the Pulitzer Prize jury panel for criticism in 2006 and 2007.

== Works ==
- The Joffrey Ballet: Robert Joffrey and the Making of an American Dance Company. Scribner, 1996.
