= Moya Moskva =

Municipal anthem of Moscow

English: 'My Moscow'
- Моя Москва
- City anthem of Moscow, Russia
- Also known as: «Дорогая моя столица» (English: 'My Dear Capital')
- Lyrics: Sergey Agranyan; Mark Lisyansky
- Music: Isaak Dunayevsky
- Adopted: 1995

"My Moscow", (Note: Russian: Моя Москва, pronounced [mɐˈja mɐˈskva].) also known as "My Dear Capital", (Note: Russian: Дорогая моя столица, pronounced [dərɐˈɡajə mɐˈja stɐˈlʲitsə].) is the municipal anthem of the Russian capital of Moscow, officially adopted in 1995. The music was composed in 1941 by Isaak Dunayevsky and the lyrics were written by Sergey Agranyan and Mark Lisyansky. Singer Zoya Rozhdestvenskaya was the first person to perform this song.

The original lyrics had four verses, of which the last pertained to Joseph Stalin. They were replaced by the current lyrics which were introduced during the Leonid Brezhnev era.

== History ==
In November 1941, during the Great Patriotic War, Junior Lieutenant and former journalist Mark Lisyansky was returning from a hospital in Yaroslavl to fight on the Kalinin Front. He later participated in the Battle of Moscow.

Worried about the fate of Moscow, Lisyansky wrote a poem in a notebook he titled "My Moscow (My Dear Capital)". After stopping on Pushkin Square, Lisyansky then sent his work to the literary journal Novy Mir. The poem was originally set to be published in the December 1941 issue of the magazine; however, due to the editorial office moving to Kuybyshev, it got pushed back to February 1942. The text then consisted of two verses, but later two more verses were added with the help of Sergey Agranyan.

== Lyrics ==
=== Current official ===
Russian original

Я по свету немало хаживал,
Жил в землянке, в окопах, в тайге,
Похоронен был дважды заживо,
Знал разлуку, любил в тоске.
Но Москвою привык я гордиться
И везде повторял я слова
Дорогая моя столица,
Золотая моя Москва!

Я люблю подмосковные рощи
И мосты над твоею рекой,
Я люблю твою Красную площадь
И кремлёвских курантов бой.
В городах и далёких станицах
О тебе не умолкнет молва,
Дорогая моя столица,
Золотая моя Москва!

Мы запомним суровую осень,
Скрежет танков и отблеск штыков,
И в веках будут жить двадцать восемь
Самых храбрых твоих сынов.
И врагу никогда не добиться,
Чтоб склонилась твоя голова,
Дорогая моя столица,
Золотая моя Москва!

Russian Latin alphabet

Ya po svetu nemalo khazhival,
Zhil v zemlyanke, v okopakh, v tayge,
Pohoronen byl dvazhdy zazhivo,
Znal razluku, lyubil v toske.
No Moskvoyu privyk ya gordit'sya
I vezde povtoryal ya slova
Dorogaya moya stolitsa,
Zolotaya moya Moskva!

Ya lyublyu podmoskovnyye roshchi
I mosty nad tvoyeyu rekoy,
Ya lyublyu tvoyu Krasnuyu ploshchad'
I kremlyovskikh kurantov boy.
V gorodakh i dalyokikh stanitsakh
O tebe ne umolknet molva,
Dorogaya moya stolitsa,
Zolotaya moya Moskva!

My zapomnim surovuyu osen',
Skrezhet tankov i otblesk shtykov,
I v vekakh budut zhit' dvadtsat' vosem'
Samykh khrabrykh tvoikh synov.
I vragu nikogda ne dobit'sya,
Chtob sklonilas' tvoya golova,
Dorogaya moya stolitsa,
Zolotaya moya Moskva!

English translation

Aplenty around the world I've wandered
In caves, trenches, and taigas I've dwelled.
Alive twice in my life I was buried,
Farewell I've bled, loved and grieved.
But with the pride of Moscow I've acquainted,
And far and wide these words I echoed:
You are my dear capital,
You are my golden Moscow!

The copses near Moscow I adore,
And the bridges above your river,
I venerate your Red Square,
And the Kremlin chimes I honour.
In the towns and villages from afar,
Shall be talks about you forever.
You are my dear capital,
You are my golden Moscow!

We shall remember that harsh fall,
Tank frays and bayonet glints we'll recall,
And your twenty-eight sons all so brave
Shall all for centuries live.
And never shall the enemy succeed
In bending down your head.
You are my dear capital,
You are my golden Moscow!

=== Original version ===
Russian original

Я по свету немало хаживал,
Жил в землянке, в окопах, в тайге,
Похоронен был дважды заживо,
Знал разлуку, любил в тоске.
Но всегда я привык гордиться,
И везде повторял я слова
Дорогая моя столица,
Золотая моя Москва!

Я люблю подмосковные рощи
И мосты над твоею рекой.
Я люблю твою Красную площадь
И кремлёвских курантов бой.
В городах и далёких станицах
О тебе не умолкнет молва,
Дорогая моя столица,
Золотая моя Москва!

Мы запомним суровую осень,
Скрежет танков и отблеск штыков,
И в веках будут жить двадцать восемь
Самых храбрых твоих сынов.
И врагу никогда не добиться,
Чтоб склонилась твоя голова,
Дорогая моя столица,
Золотая моя Москва!

Над Москвою знамёна славы,
Торжествует победу народ.
Здравствуй город Великой Державы,
Где любимый наш Сталин живёт!
Будем вечно тобою гордиться,
Будет жить твоя слава в веках,
Дорогая моя столица,
Золотая моя Москва!

Russian Latin alphabet

Ya po svetu nemalo khazhival,
Zhil v zemlyanke, v okopakh, v tayge,
Pokhoronen byl dvazhdy zazhivo,
Znal razluku, lyubil v toske.
No vsegda ya privyk gordit'sya,
I vezde povtoryal ya slova
Dorogaya moya stolitsa,
Zolotaya moya Moskva!

Ya lyublyu podmoskovnyye roshchi
I mosty nad tvoyeyu rekoy.
Ya lyublyu tvoyu Krasnuyu ploshchad'
I kremlyovskikh kurantov boy.
V gorodakh i dalyokikh stanitsakh
O tebe ne umolknet molva,
Dorogaya moya stolitsa,
Zolotaya moya Moskva!

My zapomnim surovuyu osen',
Skrezhet tankov i otblesk shtykov,
I v serdtsakh budut zhit' dvadtsat' vosemy
Samykh khrabrykh tvoikh synov.
I vragu nikogda ne dobit'sya,
Chtob sklonilas' tvoya golova,
Dorogaya moya stolitsa,
Zolotaya moya Moskva!

Nad Moskvoyu znamyona slavy,
Torzhestvuyet pobedu narod.
Zdravstvuy gorod Velikoy Derzhavy,
Gde lyubimyy nash Stalin zhivyot!
Budem vechno toboyu gordit'sya,
Budet zhit' tvoya slava v vekakh,
Dorogaya moya stolitsa,
Zolotaya moya Moskva!

English translation

Aplenty around the world I've wandered
In caves, trenches, and taigas I've dwelled.
Alive twice in my life I was buried,
Farewell I've bled, loved and grieved.
But with the pride of Moscow I've acquainted,
And far and wide these words I echoed:
You are my dear capital,
You are my golden Moscow!

The copses near Moscow I adore,
And the bridges above your river,
I venerate your Red Square,
And the Kremlin chimes I honour.
In the towns and villages from afar,
Shall be talks about you forever.
You are my dear capital,
You are my golden Moscow!

We shall remember that harsh fall,
Tank frays and bayonet glints we'll recall,
And your twenty-eight sons all so brave
Shall all for centuries live.
And never shall the enemy succeed
In bending down your head.
You are my dear capital,
You are my golden Moscow!

O'er Moscow's banner of glory,
People celebrate victory.
Hail the city of this great sovereignty
Where our dear Stalin lives on!
We shall be proud of you for eternity,
Thy glory through centuries shall live on!
You are my dear capital,
You are my golden Moscow!
