= The New House =

Painting by John Brack

- Artist: John Brack
- Year: 1953
- Type: oil on canvas on hardboard
- Dimensions: 142.5 cm × 71.2 cm (56.1 in × 28.0 in)
- Location: Art Gallery of New South Wales, Sydney

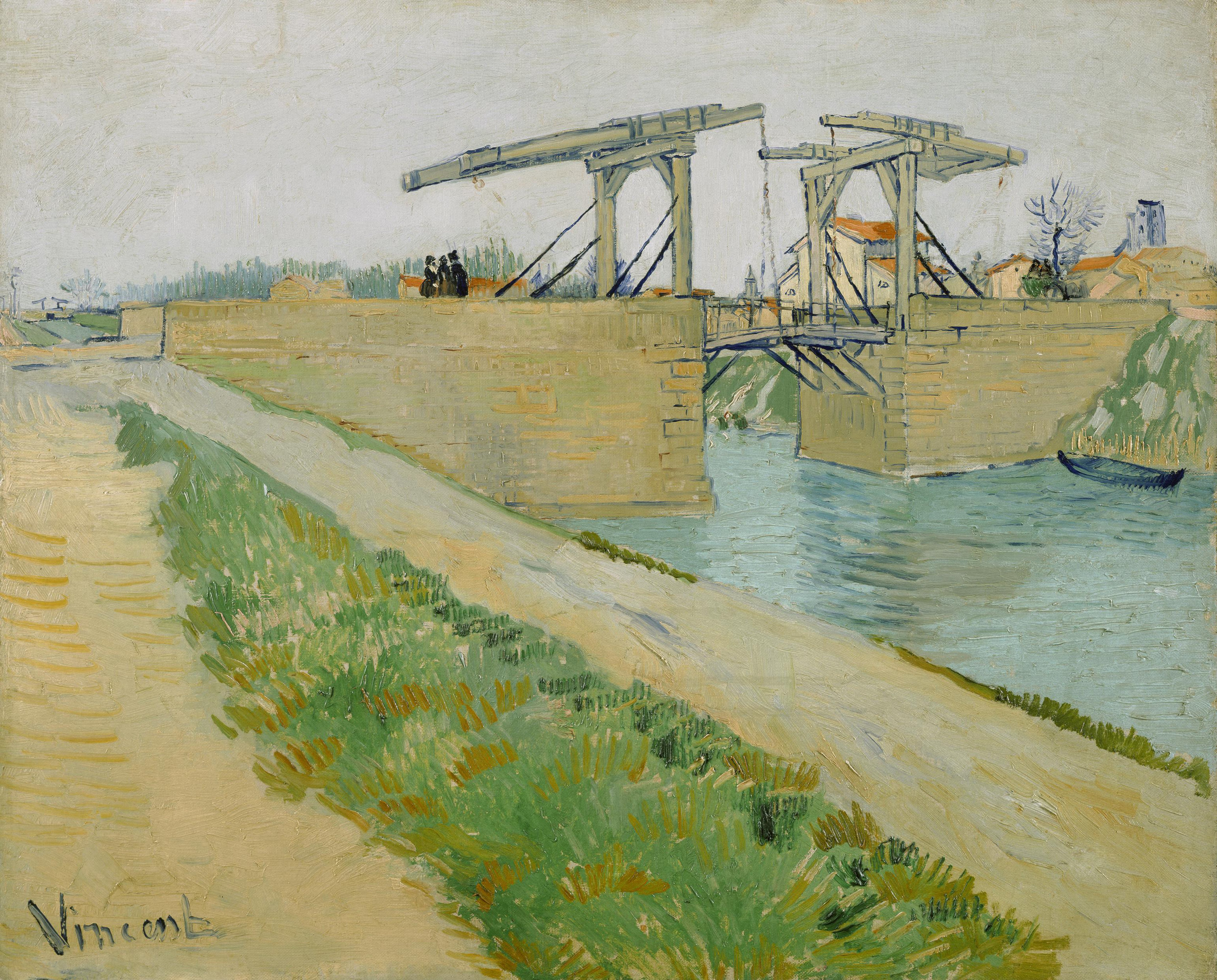
Langlois Bridge at Arles (1888) by Van Gogh. A reproduction of this work is on the wall over the fireplace.

The New House is a 1953 painting by Australian artist John Brack. The painting depicts a man and a woman standing in front of their fireplace in a room.

The work "pervades a sense of flatness, embodied by Brack's smooth application of paint, emphasising the clean, sparse qualities of the room."

In The new house, Brack boldly tackled the question of what Australian art could be in the 1950s. ... The painting aggressively dispensed with the two most obvious options at the time; epic, folkloric figuration and cosmopolitan abstraction. Bushrangers and explorers were replaced by the new pioneers, the young home buyers of the suburbs.

— Chris McAuliffe,

Previously part of the Grundy collection, the Art Gallery of New South Wales acquired the work in 2013 for A$1.6 million.
