= Brooklyn Museum Art School =

Former art school in the Brooklyn Museum

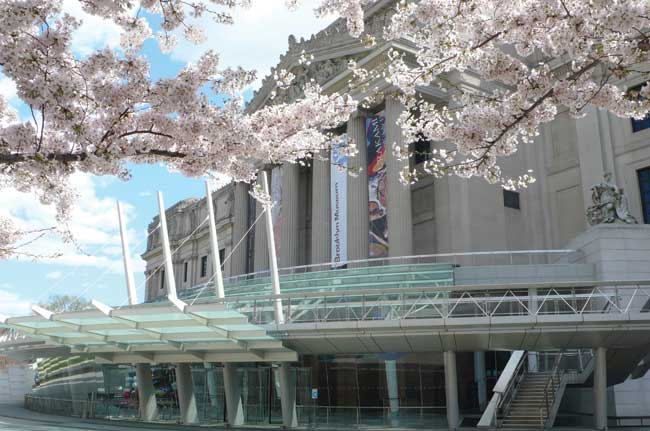
- Brooklyn Museum
- Brooklyn, New York; United States

Information
- Type: Non-degree-granting professional school

The Brooklyn Museum Art School was a non-degree-granting professional school that opened at the Brooklyn Museum in Brooklyn, New York in the summer of 1941. The Brooklyn Museum Art School provided instruction for amateur artists as well until January 1985, when it was transferred to the Pratt Institute's Continuing Education Division.

== History ==
Prior to the creation of the Brooklyn Museum Art School, classes for amateur artists had been offered by the Brooklyn Institute of Arts and Sciences (BIAS), the museum's parent organization. BIAS offered hands-on art classes dating back to 1893 on Montague Street in Brooklyn.

The Brooklyn Museum Art School title was first used in the 1941-42 annual report from the Brooklyn Museum, remaining separate from the Brooklyn Museum's Education Department, which was directed towards children. During World War II the Brooklyn Museum Art School offered limited classes in painting, photography and drawing.

In 1945 the artist Augustus Peck became director of the school and expanded its offerings. As a result of the GI Bill the Brooklyn Museum Art School had very stable income and funding, allowing many prominent artists to teach or lecture at the school and the enrollment of the school rose to 3000.

Artists included Augustus Peck, William Baziotes, Max Beckmann, Ben Shahn, and Reuben Tam. The enrollment number suffered as more institutions began to offer accredited programs in the fine arts during the late 1950s. A Bachelor of Fine Arts program in conjunction with Long Island University was planned to begin in 1959, but never came to fruition due to lack of funding.

== Notable students ==
- Pat Adams
- Helène Aylon
- Lynda Benglis
- Jyotsna Bhatt
- Lili Cassel-Wronker
- Bruce Conner
- Stephen De Staebler
- Simon Dinnerstein
- Sidney Gordin
- Irwin Hollander
- Frances Kornbluth
- Gerson Leiber
- Marisol
- Richard Mayhew
- Andres Serrano
- Robert Smithson
- Mel and Dorothy Tanner
- Murray Tinkelman
- Boaz Vaadia

== Notable instructors ==
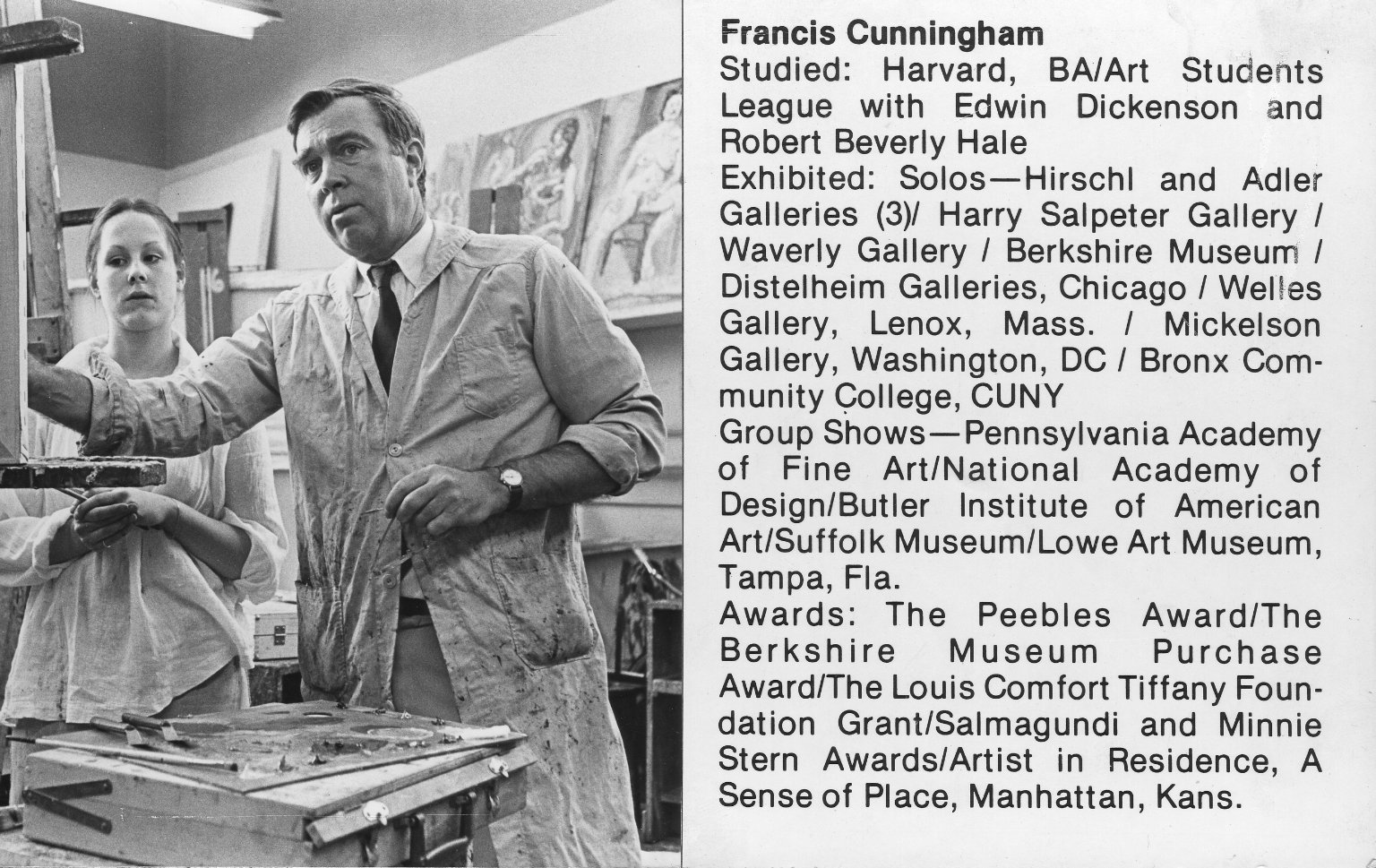
Francis Cunningham teaching at the Brooklyn Museum Art School, ca. 1979

- William Baziotes
- Max Beckmann
- Francis Cunningham
- Edwin Dickinson
- John Ferren
- Ka Kwong Hui
- Donald Judd
- Toshio Odate
- Ben Shahn
- Kendall Shaw
- Ted Stamm
- Isaac Soyer
- Reuben Tam
