= Lili Cassel-Wronker =

American illustrator and calligrapher (1924–2019)

- Born: 5 May 1924 Berlin, Germany
- Died: 10 January 2019 (aged 94) Mount Holly, New Jersey, U.S.
- Occupation: Illustrator; calligrapher
- Education: Brooklyn Museum Art School
- Genre: Children's literature
- Spouse: Erich Wronker (m. 1952)

Lili Cassel-Wronker (5 May 1924 – 10 January 2019) was a Jewish children's books illustrator and calligrapher and one of the founder of the Society of Scribes.

== Biography ==
Born in Berlin, Germany, Cassel-Wronker and her family fled the Nazi Regime in 1938 and immigrated to the United States in 1940, settling in New York. She studied art at Washington Irving High School, the Art Students League and the Brooklyn Museum Art School. She first worked at Time Magazine. She illustrated her first children's book, The Rainbow Mother Goose, in 1947. It was described by the American Institute of Graphic Arts (AIGA) as one of the "Fifty Best Books of the Year". She later taught calligraphy at the New School.

In 1952, she married Erich Wronker, of the family previously owning the German chain of stores Hermann Wronker AG, with whom she would later run a publication press from home.

== Published works ==
- Illustrations of The Rainbow Mother Goose, 1947
