= Francis Cunningham (painter) =

American painter (born 1931)

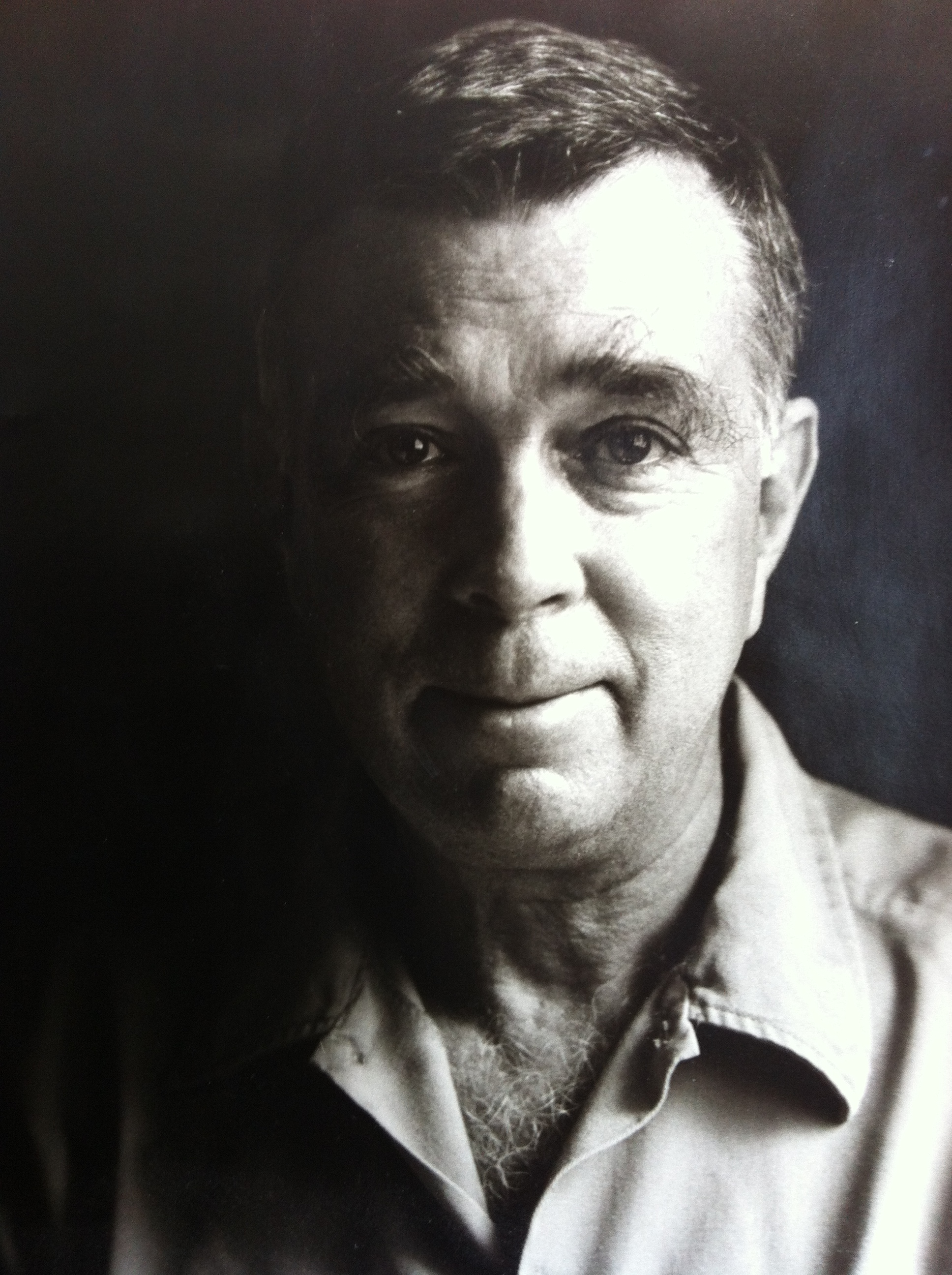
- Born: New York City, US
- Education: Harvard College
- Occupation: Artist
- Website: http://franciscunningham.com/

Francis de Lancey Cunningham Jr. (born 1931) is an American figurative painter known for working across three genres – nude, landscape and still-life—and for being an influential teacher. He co-founded the New Brooklyn School of Life, Painting, Drawing & Sculpture, Inc. (1980–1983), and the New York Academy of Art in 1983.

== Early life and education ==
Born in New York City in 1931, Francis Cunningham grew up in Pittsfield, Massachusetts, where at the age of 16 he caught the attention of artist Ben Shahn. He was further encouraged by his godmother, the Boston draftsman and painter Polly Thayer Starr. He graduated from Harvard College in 1953. After two years as a lieutenant in the U.S. Marine Corps, he attended the Art Students League of New York (1955–1959), where he studied drawing and anatomy with Robert Beverly Hale and painting with Edwin Dickinson. Cunningham, as with Dickinson and Dickinson's teacher, Charles Hawthorne, is part of an unconventional approach to realism and representation in American painting that began in 1914. Cunningham and Dickinson share a way of looking and painting summarized in the term "color-spots" that Hawthorne invented, Dickinson practiced and taught, and that Cunningham developed and passed on as a technique.

== Career ==
Cunningham has had one-man shows in Washington, Chicago and New York, where he exhibited at the Waverly, Harry Salpeter and Hirschl & Adler galleries. He has had one-man shows in Stockholm and Copenhagen and has participated in group exhibitions extensively in the U.S.

A review of his 1971 exhibition of landscapes, still lifes, and figure studies at The Mickelson Gallery referred to him "a most skillful painter" and praised his 'Oranges and Gourds' for "echoes of Cézanne" and found his nude 'Mimi Sherb' reminiscent of Thomas Eakins. The same reviewer found most of his landscapes "peculiarly flat".

In a review of an exhibit in which Cunningham participated as an artist and as a lecturer, "A Sense of Place," Ken Aupperle wrote, "For Cunningham, land is a fragile commodity requiring a public conscious to the need for its preservation". Cunningham said, "Politicians too often don't have the courage to stand up for conservation--they get their money from the rich and powerful so they avoid making the hard decisions".

Of his participation in an exhibition of four major American realist painters at the Tel Aviv Museum of Art in 1999, Angela Levine wrote, "Francis Cunningham's oils are so delicately executed that they have the appearance of watercolors in the wet-on-wet technique, so that one color merges with the next. None of his scenes are identifiable, being all made up of fragments of buildings and sky, foliage and sea which Cunningham brings together in exceptionally lyrical compositions".

He is known for his landscapes of the Berkshires and his life-size anatomically functional paintings of nudes, a topic he explores in his book, Unframing the Nude (2019) in conjunction with his Century Masters Exhibition at The Century Association in NYC.

Cunningham maintains studios in New York City and Mill River, Massachusetts. His work includes landscape, still-life and the human figure, an unusual triumvirate of genres for contemporary figurative artists.

=== Teaching career ===
Cunningham began teaching at the City College of New York (1962–1965) and the Brooklyn Museum Art School (BMAS) (1962–1980). His Sunday high school scholarship class at BMAS came to be known for its nontraditional methods of figurative painting, observing directly from nature using a plumb-line and finder, and putting down on the flat surface of the canvas abstracted color-value notes. Students included Peter Colquhoun, Israel Hershberg, Richard Leto and Ephraim Rubenstein. "Francis Cunningham taught us all how to see," said Rubenstein. "He continually implored us to look at nature freshly 'like a new-born babe,' or like 'a man from Mars,' who had never laid eyes before on the things of this earth". Cunningham taught at the Art Students League of New York (1980–1983). In 1980, he co-founded The New Brooklyn School of Life, Painting, Drawing & Sculpture, Inc., with the sculptor, Barney Hodes. Together, they also co-founded, along with Stuart Pivar, The New York Academy of Art.

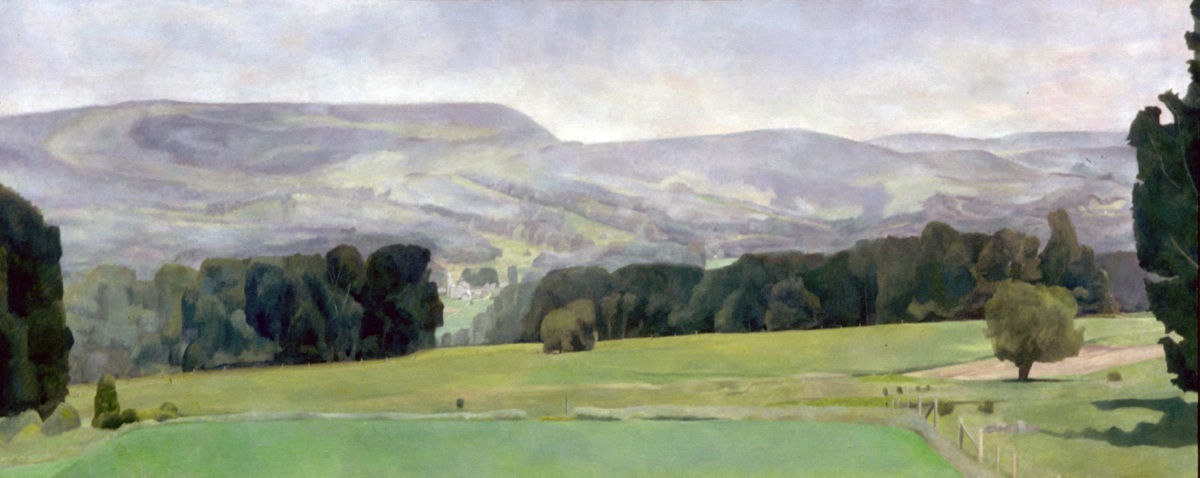
Tyringham Valley, East to Hale Farm, 1979, 20 x 60 in. (50.8 x 152.4 cm)

=== Recognition and awards ===
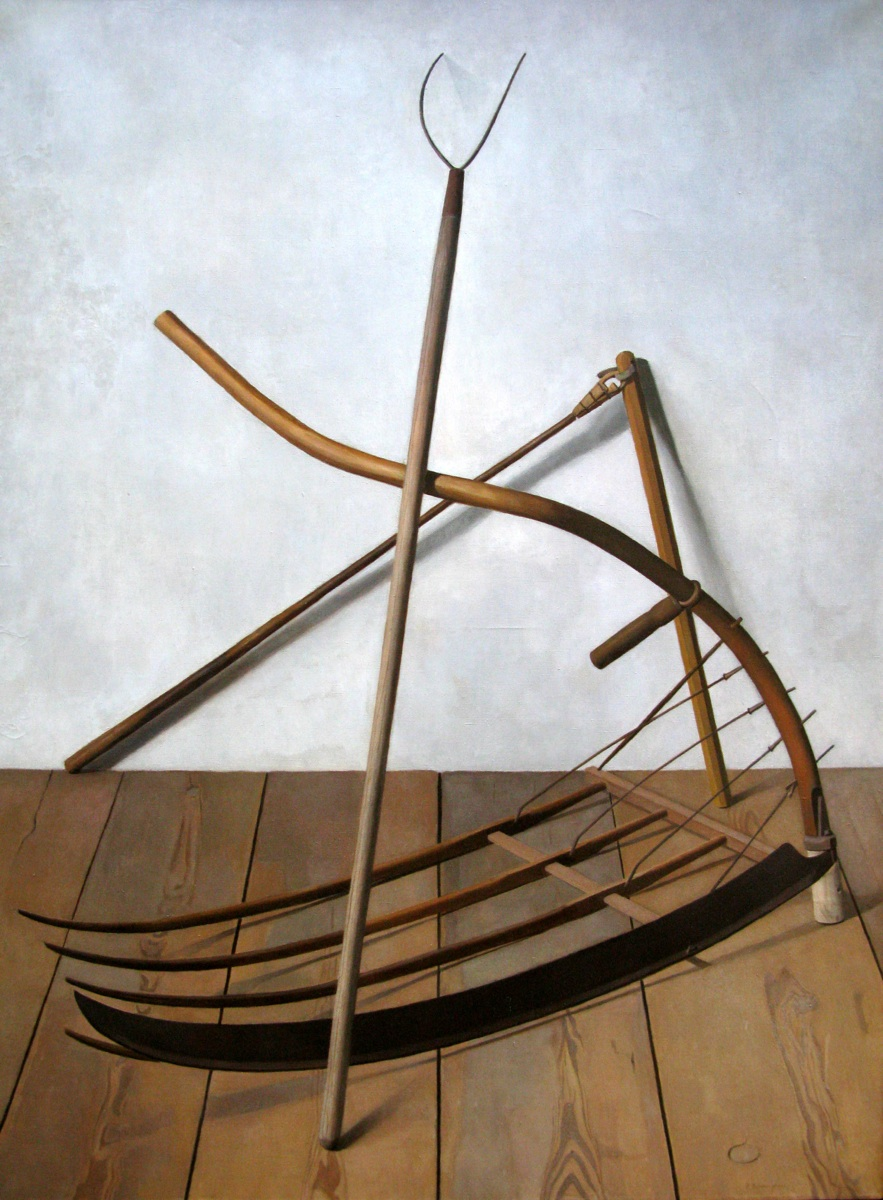
Harvest Tools, 1973, 60 x 44 in. (152.4 x 111.8 cm)

Cunningham received the Artist Equity's Benjamin West Clinedist Medal (2003) for "the achievement of exceptional artistic merit".

He is the recipient of a Louis Comfort Tiffany Foundation Grant (1973).

He was elected Academician of the National Academy of Design in 1994.

He was a Fellow with the Bogliasco Foundation (1997).

His work has been purchased by The Berkshire Museum in Pittsfield, Massachusetts.

== Personal life ==
He is married to Katharine "Kitty" Ames Spalding, and they have two daughters, including writer Sasha Anawalt.

== Works ==
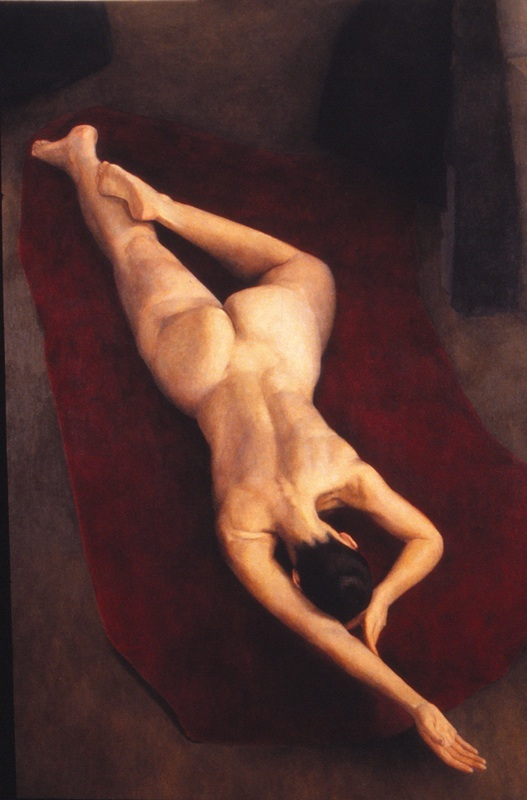
Reaching, Regina Hawkins, 1993–1996, 72 x 48 in. (182.9 x 121.9 cm)

- Fundamentals of Roentgenology. By Dr. Lucy Frank Squire. Illustrator. Harvard University Press, 1964.
- "Polykleitos' Diadoumenos' Meadurement and Animation". With D.E. Gordon. The Art Quarterly. Summer 1962.
- "Color Spots, Form and Space." Linea: Journal of the Art Students League, Vol. 4, No. 1, pp. 10–22.
- "The Nude: Mirror of Ourselves." Linea: Journal of the Art Students League, Vol. 3, No. 1, pp. 8–10.
- Unframing the Nude (2019).
