= Toshio Odate =

American sculptor and woodworker

- Born: 1930 (age 95–96); Tokyo, Japan
- Other name: Toshio Ōdate
- Years active: sculptor, woodworker, educator

Toshio Odate (Japanese: 大館 敏夫, born 1930) is a Japanese-born American sculptor, woodworker, craftsman, author, and educator. He specializes in Japanese woodworking and is a noted shoji maker. He is the author of, Japanese Woodworking Tools: Their Tradition, Spirit and Use (Taunton Press, 1984).

== Biography ==
Toshio Odate was born in 1930 in Tokyo, Japan. He trained in Japan as a cabinetmaker early in his career for 7 years starting at age 16, this was due to the economic pressure in Japan post-World War II. In 1948, he moved to the United States for one year for college, followed by a year in Denmark for study of Scandinavian design. He was planning to return to Japan to teach, however he changed his mind and Odate then decided to return to the United States, to live in New York City. In 1973, he moved to Woodbury, Connecticut.

He taught sculpture classes at Cooper Union briefly, followed by teaching at State University of New York at Purchase, Brooklyn Museum Art School, and Pratt Institute. At Brookfield Craft Center, Odate taught shoji-making classes.

His work is included in the public collection at UCR Arts, Memorial Art Gallery, Chazen Museum of Art, and Hirshhorn Museum and Sculpture Garden. Odate is included in the Brooklyn Museum Interviews of Artists, 1965–1968, and the Stephen Radich Gallery Records, 1942–1979, at the Archives of American Art.

== Publications ==
- Odate, Toshio (1984). Japanese Woodworking Tools: Their Tradition, Spirit and Use. Woodworker's Library. Newtown, Connecticut: Taunton Press. ISBN 9780918804198.
- Ōdate, Toshio (2000). Making Shoji. Fresno, California: Linden Publishing. ISBN 9780941936477.
