= Oleksandr Sviatotskyi =

Ukrainian jurist

Oleksandr Dmytrovych Sviatotskyi (Ukrainian: Олександр Дмитрович Святоцький; born 30 December 1953) is a Ukrainian jurist, Doctor of Legal Sciences (1995), Professor (1997), Member of the National Academy of Legal Sciences of Ukraine (2009), Honored Lawyer of Ukraine (1997), Editor-in-Chief of the oldest Ukrainian national Legal Journal “Law of Ukraine” (1995–), Honorary Professor of Zaporizhzhia National University.

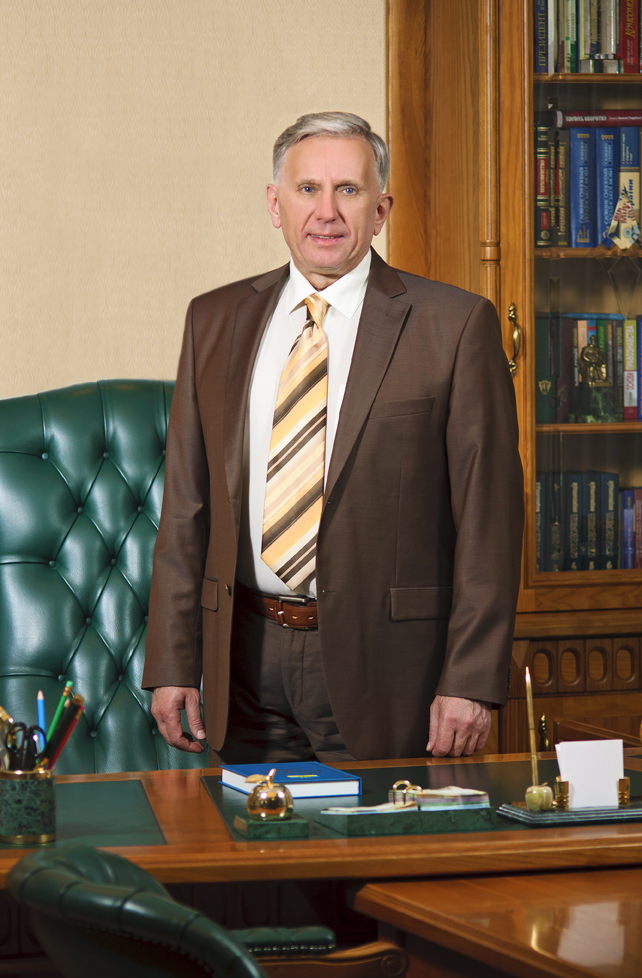
Oleksandr Dmytrovych Sviatotskyi

== Biography ==
Oleksandr Sviatotskyi was born on 30 December 1953 in Lviv, Ukraine.

== Education ==
In 1980 Dr. Sviatotskyi graduated with honors from the Faculty of Law, Ivan Franko State University of Lviv (presently Ivan Franko National University of Lviv).
In 1987 Oleksandr Sviatotskyi defended the PhD dissertation on the “Formation and development of the Soviet Bar (historical and legal aspects)” (specialty 12.00.01).
In 1995 Dr. Sviatotskyi defended the doctoral dissertation on “The Bar in the legal mechanism for protecting the rights of citizens (historical and legal research)” (specialty 12.00.01).

== Academic career ==
After graduation from the university in 1980 he worked as executive secretary in the Commission on Juvenile Affairs of Lviv City Executive Committee. From 1983 to 1990, he became a postgraduate, lecturer, senior lecturer, and associate professor at the Chair of Criminal Law and Procedure, Faculty of Law, Ivan Franko State University of Lviv.

In 1987, he defended the PhD dissertation. In 1990, he was awarded a title of associate professor. From 1990 to 1993, he had been working for doctoral degree at Faculty of Law, Taras Shevchenko National University of Kyiv. Oleksandr Sviatotskyi is a lawyer since 1994. Since 1995, he is a co-founder and senior partner of ‘“Kayros” Law Firm’ Attorneys Association. In 1995 he defended the doctoral dissertation.

He is an Editor-in-Chief of the oldest Ukrainian Legal Journal “Law of Ukraine” since October 1995. Oleksandr Sviatotskyi is a co-founder and president of the “In Jure” Publishing House LLC. In 1997, he was awarded a title of professor. Since 1997, he is a co-founder and first vice-president of the All-Ukrainian Charity Foundation of Law Enforcing Bodies, Armed Forces, and Military Formations “Ukraine”. In 2000 he became a corresponding member of the National Academy of Legal Sciences of Ukraine. In 2000/2001–2003/2004 he was appointed adviser to volunteer Prime Minister of Ukraine.

From 2002 to 2004, Dr. Sviatotskyi was appointed adviser to the Minister of Transport and Communications of Ukraine H. Kirpa. From 2001 to 2004 he was Director of the Intellectual Property Research Institute of the National Academy of Legal Sciences of Ukraine. In 2009, he became a full member of the National Academy of Legal Sciences of Ukraine. Area of scientific research: Constitutional law, organization of public authority, Theory and History of State and Law of Ukraine, philosophy of law, Judicial system, intellectual property rights, development and current legal status of the institution of advocacy. He is the author of over 200 scientific works.

Oleksandr Sviatotskyi is a member of:

- Science Advisory Board of Supreme Commercial Court of Ukraine, Supreme Specialized Court of Ukraine for Civil and Criminal Cases;
- Board of Editors of supplements to the Legal Journal “Law of Ukraine”: “Student Law Journal”, Digest “Human Rights ABC for Kids”;
- Editorial Board of “The Collection of International Treaties of Ukraine”, Legal Journal for teens “ABC of Law”, Scientific-Practical Professional Journal “European Law”;
- Editorial Board of Scientific-Practical Professional Journal “International Law”, Scientific-Practical Journal “Court Practice”;
- Scientific Council of the Journal “Reorganization and Bankruptcy”;
- Editorial Board of journals “Herald of the National Academy of Prosecutors of Ukraine”, “Civil Procedure. Court Practice in Civil Cases”, “Administrative Procedure. Court Practice in Administrative Cases”, “Criminal Procedure. Court Practice in Criminal Cases”, “Economic Procedure. Court Practice in Economic Cases”;
- Editorial Board “The Journal of Civil and Criminal Procedure”, “Herald of Economic Procedure”;
- All-Ukrainian interdepartmental coordination-methodical council on legal education of the population;
- Scientific Council of the National Academy of Sciences of Ukraine on coordination of fundamental legal research; he is also a scientific editor of the journal “European Court of Human Rights. Court Practice” (supplement to the Legal Journal “Law of Ukraine”).

== Awards and honors ==
Dr. Sviatotskyi was awarded the honorary title of Honored Lawyer of Ukraine for significant contribution to the development of statehood (1997), the Honorary Award of the President of Ukraine – Order “For Merit” III Grade (2002). Other awards include a Diploma of Honor by the Cabinet of Ministers of Ukraine (2003), Yaroslav the Wise award (2003), Certificate of Honor of the Verkhovna Rada of Ukraine, the Honorary Award of the President of Ukraine – Order “For Merit” II Grade.
In 2012 Oleksandr Sviatotskyi was awarded with breastplate “Honorary Award of the Constitutional Court of Ukraine”, Acknowledgment of the Prosecutor General of Ukraine, Honorary Award of the Supreme Commercial Court of Ukraine “Badge of Honor”, Honorary Decoration of National University “Odssa Law Academy” II Grade, Medal “For Merits in the Development of the Advocacy”, a Diploma of Honor by the Secretariat of the National Union of Journalists of Ukraine, Diploma of Ivan Franko National University of Lviv, Decoration of Law Department, Vadym Hetman Kyiv National Economic University.

== Notes and references ==
Legal Journal “Law of Ukraine”
Law Firm “Kayros”
“In Jure” Publishing House LLC.
