= 1953 in fine arts of the Soviet Union =

The year 1953 was marked by many events that left an imprint on the history of Soviet and Russian Fine Arts.

== Events ==
- The Spring exhibition of works by leningrad artists of 1953 opened in the Leningrad Union of Artists. The participants were Nikolai Babasuk, Vsevolod Bazhenov, Leonid Baykov, Konstantin Belokurov, Dmitry Beliayev, Vasily Vikulov, Nikolai Volodimirov, Lev Volshtein, Ekaterina Efimova, Elena Kostenko, Nikolai Kostrov, Anna Kostrova, Alexandra Levushina, Vera Lubimova, Pen Varlen, Ivan Penteshin, Yuri Podlasky, Mikhail Poniatov, Igor Razdrogin, Ivan Savenko, Yuri Skorikov, Elena Skuin, Elena Tabakova, Victor Teterin, Nikolai Timkov, Mikhail Tkachev, Boris Fogel, Rudolf Frentz, and other important Leningrad artists.
- An artist Victor Oreshnikov is appointed the rector of the Repin Institute of Arts. Headed an institute up to 1979 year.
- October 17 — Second All-Union Exhibition of graduates of the Art Institute of 1953 opened in Moscow. Featured the works of Oleg Betekhtin, Nikolai Galakhov, Boris Kotik, Valeria Larina, Nikolai Lomakin, Solomon Epshtein, Vladimir Seleznev, and others.
- Exhibition of works by famous Russian artist and teacher Dmitry Kardovsky (1866–1943) opened in Museum of the Academy of Arts in Leningrad.

== Deaths ==
- May 31 — Vladimir Tatlin (Russian: Татлин Владимир Евграфович), Russian soviet artists (born 1885).
- June 25 — Alexander Osmerkin (Russian: Осмёркин Александр Александрович), Russian soviet painter (born 1892).
- July 4 — Piotr Kotov (Russian: Котов Пётр Иванович), Russian soviet painter, Honored art worker of Russian Federation (born 1889).
- October 6 — Vera Mukhina, (Russian: Мухина Вера Игнатьевна), Russian soviet sculptor, People's Artist of the USSR, Stalin Prize winner, author of monument Worker and Kolkhoz Woman (born 1889).
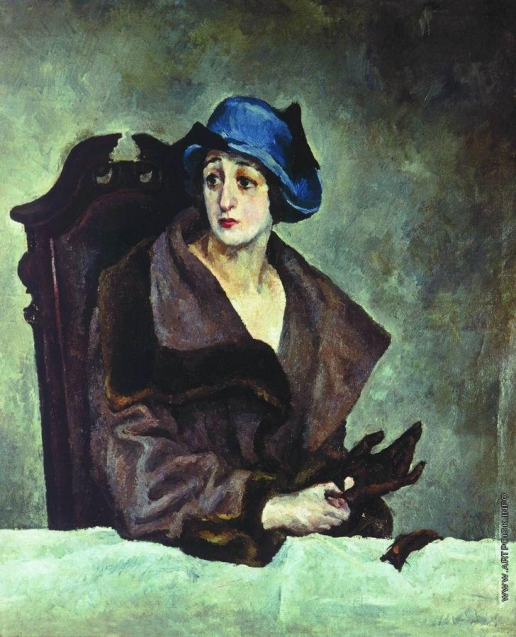
Alexander Osmerkin - Portrait of a lady, 1910, Tretyakov gallery

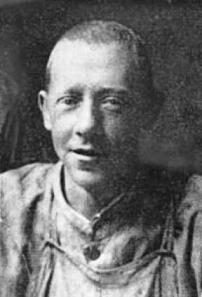
Vladimir Tatlin

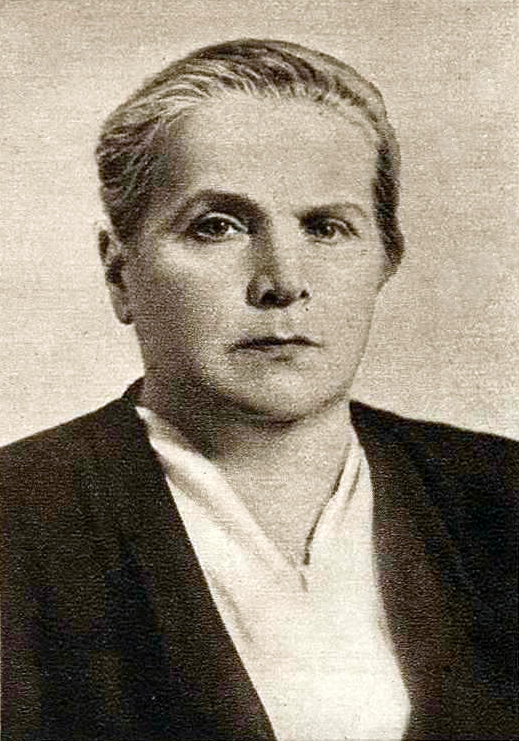
Vera Mukhina

== See also ==
- List of Russian artists
- List of painters of Leningrad Union of Artists
- Saint Petersburg Union of Artists
- Russian culture
- 1953 in the Soviet Union

== Sources ==
- Весенняя выставка произведений ленинградских художников 1953 года. Каталог. Л., ЛССХ, 1953.
- Вторая Всесоюзная выставка дипломных работ студентов художественных институтов СССР выпуска 1953 года. Каталог. М., МК СССР, 1953.
- Дмитрий Николаевич Кардовский. Выставка произведений. Каталог. М., Советский художник, 1953.
- Artists of Peoples of the USSR. Biography Dictionary. Vol. 1. Moscow, Iskusstvo, 1970.
- Artists of Peoples of the USSR. Biography Dictionary. Vol. 2. Moscow, Iskusstvo, 1972.
- Выставки советского изобразительного искусства. Справочник. Т.4. 1948—1953 годы. М., Советский художник, 1976.
- Directory of Members of Union of Artists of USSR. Volume 1,2. Moscow, Soviet Artist Edition, 1979.
- Directory of Members of the Leningrad branch of the Union of Artists of Russian Federation. Leningrad, Khudozhnik RSFSR, 1980.
- Artists of Peoples of the USSR. Biography Dictionary. Vol. 4 Book 1. Moscow, Iskusstvo, 1983.
- Directory of Members of the Leningrad branch of the Union of Artists of Russian Federation. - Leningrad: Khudozhnik RSFSR, 1987.
- Artists of peoples of the USSR. Biography Dictionary. Vol. 4 Book 2. - Saint Petersburg: Academic project humanitarian agency, 1995.
- Link of Times: 1932 - 1997. Artists - Members of Saint Petersburg Union of Artists of Russia. Exhibition catalogue. - Saint Petersburg: Manezh Central Exhibition Hall, 1997.
- Matthew C. Bown. Dictionary of 20th Century Russian and Soviet Painters 1900-1980s. London, Izomar, 1998.
- Vern G. Swanson. Soviet Impressionism. Woodbridge, England, Antique Collectors' Club, 2001.
- Время перемен. Искусство 1960—1985 в Советском Союзе. СПб., Государственный Русский музей, 2006.
- Sergei V. Ivanov. Unknown Socialist Realism. The Leningrad School. Saint-Petersburg, NP-Print Edition, 2007. ISBN 5-901724-21-6, ISBN 978-5-901724-21-7.
- Anniversary Directory graduates of Saint Petersburg State Academic Institute of Painting, Sculpture, and Architecture named after Ilya Repin, Russian Academy of Arts. 1915 - 2005. Saint Petersburg: Pervotsvet Publishing House, 2007.
