= Composition with Still Life =

1937 painting by Edwin Dickinson

Composition with Still Life is a painting by the American artist Edwin Dickinson (1891–1978). Begun in 1933 and completed in 1937, it is Dickinson's largest work. Painted in oil on canvas and nearly monochromatic, the allegorical composition depicts two headless nudes in a mysterious setting amid still life elements. The painting is in the collection of The Museum of Modern Art in New York.

== History ==
In November 1933 Dickinson decided to put aside his large painting Woodland Scene, which he had been unable to bring to a satisfactory resolution, and began a new painting—his largest—that he eventually gave the neutral name of Composition with Still Life. Adopting a more systematic method of painting than he had used previously, he began by mixing batches of paints in incremental values, evidently limited saturation, and with the darkest value considerably higher in key than in his darker, earlier pictures, a method that he employed in Stranded Brig as well. Work progressed steadily in 1934, except for the period Dickinson worked on Stranded Brig, followed by a hospitalization for back pain and ulcers, and for two months at the beginning of 1935, when he finished up work on Woodland Scene at the request of his patron, Esther Hoyt Sawyer. Despite teaching painting classes at the Art Institute of Buffalo in the fall of 1934 and the following spring, Dickinson, with the use of Esther's painting studio, managed 216 sittings by June 16, 1935. But eleven days later, on the family's return to Provincetown, police stopped them to inform them that Edwin's eldest brother, Howard, had been murdered in Detroit. Howard's death hit him hard, and he ceased work on the painting. Although he made some attempts to resume work on the painting, and despite his keen awareness of the importance to his career of completing the painting swiftly and well, it was not until May 1936 that he resumed steady work on it. From then on, he worked at it fairly steadily, despite a few interruptions, until March 14, 1937, when the sittings numbered 396. Nineteen sittings were done beginning June 27 and then a long break until September 20, after which, in a flurry of activity, he added another fifty sittings. He painted the final object in his picture, a pale blue rose, between October 30 and November 1, on which day he wrote in his journal that the picture was done.

== Analysis ==
Adler found Composition with Still Life especially difficult to provide a psychological interpretation of, but thought it suggested "a picture of journey's end or of the last harbor." He observed that the presentation of objects and figures "—empty, abandoned, useless, dropped—conveys a sense of impotence, frigidity, or death." Mitchell Kahan recognized in this work, as in other paintings by Dickinson, "an iconography of concealment," created by showing only parts of things, blurring boundaries, and obscuring relationships. He perceived the effect to be "a haunting sense of loss," the paradoxical product of "Dickinson's incessant gaze and prolonged study of form," and in this work combined with a sense of decapitation and death. Driscoll recognizes water symbolism suggestive of disaster and death at sea in the imagery and relates it to shipwrecks that occurred in Provincetown, some of which he witnessed.

Ward points out that the title that Dickinson gave the painting, as well as its original name, Figures and Still Life seem to reflect his determination to discourage interpretation. He suggests, however, that he must have become aware of the effect of the imagery as the painting developed and that it is perhaps significant that in 1945, expressing dissatisfaction with the picture's title, he wrote to Esther, ""I . . . think I should call it 'The Flying Dutchman,'" the name of the legendary ship doomed to sail forever with its crew of dead men, despite the fact that the imagery does not support that specific subject. Ward agrees with other writers about the strong sense of death created by the headless figures, the denuded trees, the horizontal vases, the ruined steps and railing descending into darkness, the spiral object, used to circulate water, but lying useless, and a form suggesting a broken bone in the right foreground. He compares the picture's entrance, leading into the dark void below, to the entrance in The Glen (Andrée's Balloon) It is comparable as well to the area of darkness in the foreground of Stranded Brig, which Dickinson called "a deep chasm," and the entrance to Inland Lake, although here not into, but over, a dark void. Ward suggests that Composition with Still Life is the Dickinson work most explicitly presented as a dream through the combination of solid, detailed forms with passages that melt into gaseous substances or dissolve into one another. He observes that this is the first of the large pictures in which there is no central figure whose dream the imagery might depict and that the descent into darkness represents a descent into the artist's unconscious mind "to come to terms with his losses and heal himself." He argues that not only the imagery but the process represents a voyage into the unknown, one that for Elaine de Kooning represents a greater willingness to confront the unexpected than does the process of Abstract Expressionists. Ward suggests that the picture may well have been affected by Howard's death and that Dickinson's decision to declare it finished on November 1, despite having left large areas unresolved, such as the section at the upper left, may have been determined by the fact that it was the anniversary of Herbert Groesbeck's death.

In a way, Dickinson saw the painting as a triumph over death, describing his rapid conclusion of work on it by writing that it was "snatched from the grave in a few weeks." Ward points out that this painting was the one most closely connected to his life, being begun on the anniversary of the date he became romantically involved with his wife-to-be and just prior to which he had his father baptize his son in the studio. The rose appears again, and Ward associates it with the archetype of "the comforting, the nourishing, the 'good' mother—young and beautiful—who was known to us, and even tasted, in the remotest past." But it may also be seen (in light of its associations with the Swedish art student who gave Dickinson a rose when his brother died) as having been placed in the picture in memory of all his dead loved ones.
