= Zoya Rozhdestvenskaya =

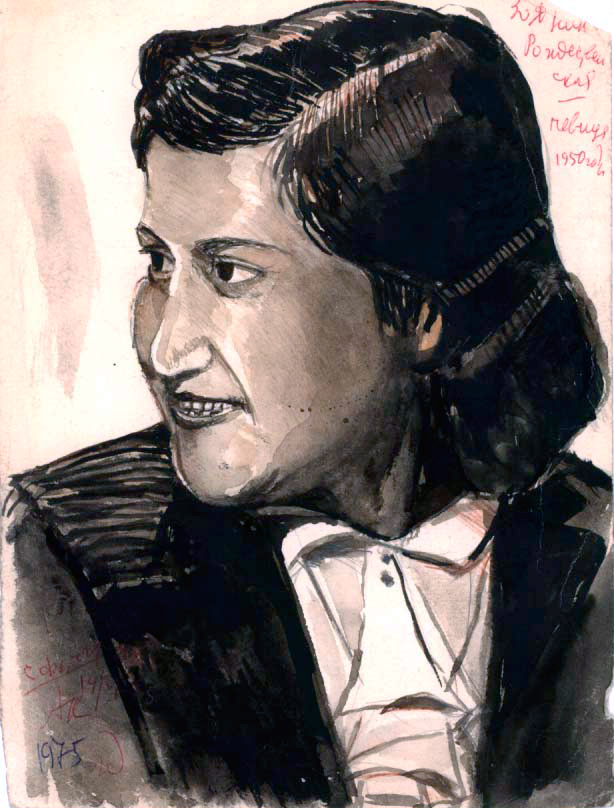
Zoya Rozhdestvenskaya portrait, 1950

Zoya Nikolayevna Rozhdestvenskaya (Note: Russian: Зоя Николаевна Рождественская, IPA: [ˈzojə nʲɪkɐˈɫajɪvnə rɐʐˈdʲestvʲɪnskəjə]) (16 August 1906 – 8 November 1953) was a Soviet singer, a holder of the title of Meritorious Artist of the RSFSR. She was the original performer of the song "My Moscow" (Russian: «Моя Москва»).
