= Khas-Magomed Hadjimuradov =

Chechen bard

Khas-Magomed Hadjimuradov Хас-Магомед Хаджимурадов
- Photo taken in 1997

Background information
- Born: Khas-Magomed Hadjimuradov; December 18, 1953 (age 72)
- Origin: Kazakh SSR, Soviet Union
- Genres: Music of Chechnya, Bard (Soviet Union)
- Occupation: Singer
- Instruments: Voice; guitar

Khas-Magomed Hadjimuradov (Chechen: Хас-Магомед Хаджимурадов; born December 18, 1953) is a Chechen nationalist bard.

Khas-Magomed was born in the Zhambyl Province of Kazakhstan to Chechen parents, who had been forcibly removed from their homes in Chechnya as the result of the forced deportations of the Chechen and Ingush people to Central Asia on February 23, 1944. He spent much of his early youth in the village of Panfilovka in the Chuy Province of neighboring Kyrgyzstan, before his family returned to their native village of Novye Atagi. After graduating from secondary school in 1971, he served in the Red Army from 1973 to 1975.

To bolster the national identity of the Chechen people, Khas-Magomed performed nationalistic songs of Chechen heroes on Soviet television, hoping to revive the national consciousness of the Chechens and to restore "k'onalah", or the code of ethics in Chechen culture.
