= No. 61 (Rust and Blue) =

Painting by Mark Rothko

- Artist: Mark Rothko
- Year: 1953
- Medium: Oil on canvas
- Dimensions: 292.74 cm × 233.68 cm (115.25 in × 92.00 in)
- Location: Museum of Contemporary Art; Los Angeles

No. 61 (Rust and Blue) is a 1953 painting by the Russian-American Abstract expressionist artist Mark Rothko. The work was first exhibited at the Museum of Modern Art, New York in 1961 but is now in the collection of the Museum of Contemporary Art, Los Angeles. Similar to Rothko's other works from this period, No. 61 consists of large expanses of color with dark shades. Rust and Blue was a part of the Color Field movement. Rust and Blue also uses layered coloring. Rothko described this as "inner light". Rothko painted in such a way that at times paint can be seen flowing upward across the surface.

== Sources ==
- Baal-Teshuva, Jacob. Rothko. Berlin: Taschen, 2003. ISBN 3-8228-1820-8
