= The Fossil Hunters =

Painting by Edwin Dickinson

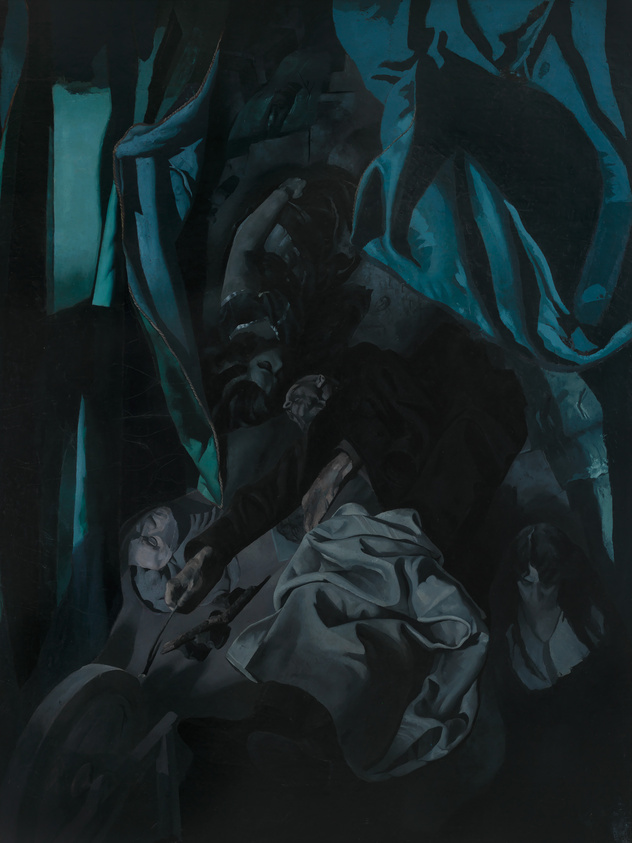
- Artist: Edwin Dickinson
- Year: 1926-1928
- Location: Whitney Museum, New York

The Fossil Hunters is a painting by the American artist Edwin Dickinson (1891–1978). Painted in 1926–28, it was the largest painting he had done at the time, and required 192 sittings to complete. The painting, which is in the collection of the Whitney Museum of American Art, contains the most explicit references to Dickinson's roots and loved ones.

== Analysis ==
The Fossil Hunters is a dark, monochromatic scene depicting an old man and a young woman asleep in an ambiguous setting amid draperies and rocks. The word "Sheldrake," incised on rock above the old man, names a town on the west side of Saranac Lake where the young Dickinson spent summers exploring the glens near the family's summer cottage, where he hunted for fossils and to which he returned periodically as an adult to visit. The rocky ground on which the figures rest is meant to suggest this terrain. "F2," written in the sail hanging at the left, refers to Frances (Pat) Foley, his fiancé, and the letters B.D., beneath the mask of Beethoven are the initials of the artist's older brother Burgess Dickinson—known as Beethoven to his classmates at Yale—who had died by suicide in 1913. The female figure in the lower right corner was posed for by his sister, Antoinette, or "Tibi".

The title refers to the fossils that Dickinson had searched for as a child in Sheldrake, and again while visiting in the summer of 1926 before starting work on the painting. A few trilobites are included, the Beethoven mask lies on a large brachiopod, and the corner of a photograph of a fossil is visible under the man's right elbow. The picture was unnamed in his letters or journals until after he had read a history of men who had developed vaccines to combat debilitating diseases, Microbe Hunters, including tuberculosis, which killed his mother. The author compared scientists searching for cures to artists and stated that the search of microbe hunters was risky, sometimes fatal. Rather than hunters, the principal figures appear to be sleeping or dead.

Driscoll believes that all of the picture's imagery are "memory stimulants" and takes a passage Dickinson had underlined from Proust as the picture's inspiration. Remarkable, however, is the absence of any detail in this painting inviting association with the properties Proust singled out in the cited passage as the bearers of "the vast structure of recollection": "the smell and taste of things".

Clinical psychologist Eliot Adler (invited by art historian Matthew Baigell to make some observations about four of Dickinson's pictures, based evidently only on the information in Lloyd Goodrich's 1965 catalogue) took Dickinson's remark about searching for fossils "in his native country" as linking the picture's terrain with "the earth from which he sprang". In addition to references to death and a return to the earth, Adler points to imagery that suggests birth from an Earth Mother, including the "distinctly labial" drapery. Ward agrees, pointing to the woman apparently emerging from a void in the rocky cliff (in the preferred birth orientation, head first) through the drawn-back curtains. He suggests that the idea of Mother Earth as the picture's setting is deliberate, as indicated by a clue Dickinson left. Just above the emerging woman is a breast presented as part of the rock formation. Although it matches the rocks in value and hue, its spherical shape, reinforced by its cast shadow, and the suggestion of a nipple, make the metaphor clear. Dickinson at one point had painted a seated nude at the top of the picture, and Adler identifies her as the mother from which his sister at the lower right and he himself (whom Adler identifies as the old man) were born. The identification of his brother with Beethoven (not known of by Adler) strengthens the idea. The breast, then, may be understood as a more subtle reference to Mother Earth than the nude it replaced. Dickinson described the two reclining figures as sleeping, which suggests that the scene may be dreamed by the old man, who imagines himself as asleep on his mother's body, comforted by the memories of loved ones.

Ward suggests that a specific dream Dickinson described in a letter may also explain an important part of the painting's meaning, particularly because he seems to have been reminded of it by the topic he had just been discussing. On November 12, 1926, four days before he began painting his picture, but eleven days after he began planning it, he wrote of the upcoming Beethoven centennial and of a Buffalo man who had met Beethoven. Then with no transition he wrote, "Dreamed last night I saved a man from drowning in Havanna [sic] harbor." Since writing about Beethoven seems to have reminded him of his dream, Ward suggests that the man he saved in his dream was his brother, that it expressed a wish that he could have saved his brother's life when he leaped from Edwin's sixth floor apartment. He argues that the dream has a specific art reference to John Singleton Copley's painting, Watson and the Shark, in the Boston Museum of Fine Arts. It depicts the young Brook Watson being rescued from a shark (and from drowning) in Havana Harbor. Dickinson may well have intended the painting he was about to be a means of "rescuing" Burgess through art. The following March, Dickinson wrote that he was given a death mask of Beethoven. Significantly, the death mask shows his eyes closed. Dickinson opened the eyes in his painting, and in so doing, not only immortalized his brother, but gave him back the life he remembered him having.

Adler sees the old man as holding a stick (a symbolic paintbrush) to the grindstone as expressing the artist's "'labor' to give birth to something eternal," as signified by the fossil-like Beethoven mask by his hand, the reference to a hunt for fossils referring to this desire to leave behind remains—art—that will survive death, as a woman's children outlive her. Dickinson himself admitted that the desire to make something as lasting as the work of the old masters was manifested in the size of the work (at 96½ inches high it was the largest painting he had done).

== Exhibition history ==
The Fossil Hunters achieved considerable notoriety when exhibited at the Carnegie International of 1928, because it was hung sideways, a mistake perpetuated by subsequent exhibitions in 1929 at the Pennsylvania Academy of Fine Arts (where the error was caught before the opening) and in New York at the National Academy of Design, where it created an even greater uproar by winning a prize in its disoriented condition.
