= Andrey Soloviev =

Soviet war photographer (1953–1993)

- Born: 7 October 1953; USSR
- Died: 27 September 1993 (aged 39); Sukhumi, Abkhazia
- Cause of death: Killed in action (gunshot wound)
- Occupation: War photographer

Andrey Borisovich Soloviev (Russian: Андрей Борисович Соловьёв; 7 October 1953 – September 27, 1993) was a Soviet war photographer.

He was killed by sniper fire while covering the battle for Sukhumi in the War in Abkhazia.

Soloviev studied at the Moscow Institute of Architecture but never graduated. Instead, he became a photojournalist, joining the Itar-TASS news agency in 1987. He also worked as a stringer for the Associated Press.

After the break-up of the Soviet Union, Andrey Soloviev covered many armed conflicts, including in Nagorno-Karabakh, Transnistria, Tajikistan, Uzbekistan, South Ossetia. He also filmed the aftermath of the 1988 Armenian earthquake, the collapse of the regime of Nicolae Ceaușescu, and was in Iraq during the Gulf War.

His photographs received numerous awards, including the World Press Photo prize.
