= Ruin at Daphne =

Painting by Edwin Dickinson

Ruin at Daphne is an oil painting on canvas by the American artist Edwin Dickinson (1891–1978). His major painting of the 1940s, the work occupied Dickinson between 1943 and 1953. The painting, which is in the collection of the Metropolitan Museum of Art in New York, is an architectural fantasy in red and gray tones.

== History ==
Ruin at Daphne was inspired by the Roman ruins that had impressed Dickinson while visiting Europe during 1937–38. It began as "a 60/48 of antique peristyle, villa of 1820 & pool," done from imagination and, after moving to New York in 1944, also from library research on Roman buildings. As he explained to his patron Esther Sawyer, it represented a decision to move away from the "less gay" subjects that had been the focus of his major studio paintings and to paint to enjoy himself as much as possible. Yet his interest in history was closely allied to his interest in memory, and Dickinson wanted to dedicate the picture to his brother Burgess (who committed suicide in 1913), an intention he had harbored long before the painting began.

For the painting, Dickinson reused a canvas on which he had begun a self-portrait, which he scraped off and covered the remains with a red-brown paint. On this, he began a detailed perspective drawing in pencil that he modeled with three values of the red-brown paint. Although the architectural subject fascinated him, the formal concerns were primary in his mind. In 1945, he wrote to Sawyer, "The color (long since decided upon) and the composition are what it is to be about." He was excited about the challenge posed by having to invent the buildings, which permitted him compositional freedom to indulge in a complex interplay of form much like that permitted to a purely abstract painter, as well as a freedom to make multiple revisions of the arrangement.

At the end of 1943, he had decided to title it Three Periods of Architecture in Provence; after realizing that in southern France, people were living in homes next to ancient Roman architecture and that the distant past was woven into their daily lives. At the beginning of 1946, he rechristened it Villa Chedanne in honor of Georges Paul Chedanne, a turn-of-the-century French architect who had an interest in Roman architecture. His revised idea was that his architectural invention represented a Roman ruin in Syria that Chedanne bought and landscaped, and to which he added a pool.

=== Difficulty working on the painting ===
By May 1946, Dickinson had nearly ceased work on the painting, and for six months beginning in the fall of 1946 he went regularly to the Metropolitan Museum to paint a copy of El Greco's View of Toledo. Ward believes that Dickinson had come to feel that in his prolonged work on Ruin at Daphne he had lost the sense of purpose that had given his art its direction, and that by copying El Greco's painting he not only renewed contact with the artist he most admired but the depicted city where had seen the El Greco painting of which he once said, "When I saw the Burial of Count Orgaz, I knew where my aspirations lay. Dickinson continued to have difficulty returning to work on the painting, although in 1947 and early 1948 he attempted to introduce figures into the painting, none of which remain.

In March 1948, he resumed steady work on the painting, but during the following two years, little was done on it. In 1949, Elaine de Kooning wrote an article on the painting for ARTnews in its series, "[name of featured artist] Paints a Picture." It was illustrated by photographs of three stages in the painting's progress (the first two misdated).

In 1951, he put in more work on the painting, but only in early 1952, anticipating its exhibition in the Fifteen Americans exhibition at the Museum of Modern Art (together with Jackson Pollock, Mark Rothko, Clyfford Still and other major modernists), did he finally begin to overpaint the preliminary reds and pinks in which he had worked out the picture's design. Working from the center outwards, he had only painted 30% of the canvas in the new, off-gray color when, in 1954, while the painting was being moved to an exhibition, a gust of wind blew it over, knocking over the men who were carrying it and tearing a hole in the lower right corner. The hole was repaired, but heavy varnish was applied by the restorer, making future work difficult.

Elaine de Kooning's article, with photographs of its transformation, had a significant role in boosting Dickinson's recognition. It is likely that the photographic record of the painting's lengthy evolution gave Elaine's husband, Willem de Kooning, the idea of working on a painting (Woman I) over an extended period (June 1950 to January or February 1952) and documenting the changes with photographs. The 1949 photo of Ruin at Daphne and the photo of the first two states of De Kooning's painting in 1950 were photographed by the same photographer, Rudolph Burckhardt. Not only were both works "process paintings", in which the artists' ideas evolved in response to the changing appearance of the pictures, but neither artist regarded his painting as finished when he stopped work on it. The Metropolitan Museum acquired Dickinson's painting in 1955.
