= Edwin Dickinson =

American painter (1891–1978)

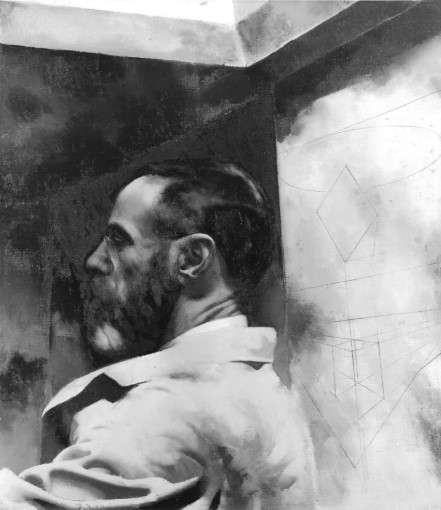
- Born: Edwin Walter Dickinson; October 11, 1891; Seneca Falls, New York
- Died: December 2, 1978 (aged 87); Orleans, Massachusetts
- Known for: Painting, drawing
- Patrons: Esther and Ansley Sawyer, Sheldon Dick

Edwin Walter Dickinson (October 11, 1891 – December 2, 1978) was an American painter and draftsman best known for psychologically charged self-portraits, quickly painted landscapes, which he called premier coups, and large, hauntingly enigmatic paintings involving figures and objects painted from observation, in which he invested his greatest time and concern. His drawings are also widely admired and were the subject of the first book published on his work. Less well known are his premier coup portraits and nudes, his medium-sized paintings done entirely from imagination or incorporating elements from one of his drawings or done from observation over several days or weeks, including still lifes, portraits of others, both commissioned and not, and nudes.

His style of painting, which eschewed details in favor of close attention to the relationships between masses of color, was strongly influenced by the example of his teacher Charles W. Hawthorne. The strange juxtapositions and perplexing hints of narrative in his large compositions have been compared to Surrealism, and his premier coups often approach abstraction, but Dickinson resisted being identified with any art movement.

== History ==
=== Early life and art training ===
Dickinson was born and raised in Seneca Falls, New York, in the Finger Lakes area; his family moved to Buffalo in 1897. The death of his mother from tuberculosis in 1903, the suicide in 1913 of his older brother, Burgess, his father's remarriage in 1914 to a much younger woman, and the death of a close friend in combat have all been cited as influences on the themes of his later work. As a boy Dickinson had assumed he would become a minister, like his father, but his brother's suggestion of a career in the navy proved more to his liking. After failing the entrance exam of the U.S. Naval Academy twice, in 1911 he enrolled at the Art Students League, where he studied under William Merritt Chase. In the summers of 1912 and 1913 he stayed in Provincetown, Massachusetts, where he studied with Charles W. Hawthorne, and continued there year-round from 1913 to the summer of 1916, working as Hawthorne's assistant in 1914. From late summer 1916 through year's end Dickinson investigated the possibilities of printmaking in Provincetown with fellow painter Ross Moffett, and made further attempts in the 1920s and '30s, but felt his time was better spent painting.

Hawthorne, who had himself been a student of Chase and perpetuated some of his ideas, had a strong influence on Dickinson's painting methods and ideas, many of which he retained in his later teaching. Dickinson's Self-Portrait of 1914 is what Hawthorne's students called a "mudhead", a back-lit figure built up in color patches, working outward from the center, rather than filling in contours. Hawthorne had his students use palette knives and even fingers, "as if painting had been just invented" and preventing them from trying to paint details instead establishing relationships between "spots" (i.e., patches) of color. From Hawthorne, Dickinson learned to look for the unexpected and to paint without formulas, to squint to determine value relationships, and to believe that a painting will be better if one leaves off when inspiration wanes, no matter how much is done. Dickinson's use of Hawthorne's ideas in his teaching has been described by one of his former students, Francis Cunningham.

=== World War I and European trip ===
Dickinson spent time teaching painting in Buffalo and working as a telegrapher in New York City until his naval service from late 1917 to 1919. World War I had interrupted Dickinson's plans to visit Europe with his close friend and fellow painter, Herbert Groesbeck, and while Dickinson served in the navy off the coast of New England, Groesback traveled to Europe as a soldier and died in the Argonne Forest in one of the last battles of the war. His death seemed to reawaken Dickinson's pain over earlier losses of his mother and brother and to affect subsequent paintings. A trip to Paris to study art followed between December 1919 and July 1920, financed by a gift from Groesbeck's widow and parents of the insurance money paid on his death. Dickinson made a side trip to visit his grave in northern France and then to Spain; two paintings by El Greco in Toledo he declared the best he had ever seen, an admiration that persisted throughout his life. The subject of one was especially meaningful to Dickinson, having visited Groesbeck's grave so recently, The Burial of Count Orgaz.

=== Financial instability ===
A few of Dickinson's early works garnered recognitions, most notably Interior, which was exhibited at the Corcoran Gallery in Washington in 1916 and three other major venues, and Old Ben and Mrs. Marks, 1916, which was shown in New York in 1917 and in the Luxembourg Museum in Paris in 1919, where Dickinson saw it. However, this recognition did not continue after his return from Europe. Despite the financial support of a patron, Esther Hoyt Sawyer, Dickinson struggled financially. In 1924, Dickinson reached a low point after an inheritance from his mother and some money from his father ran out. He was unable to sell An Anniversary, a major painting on which he had worked steadily for thirteen months, and two commissioned portraits, one of his uncle Charles Evans Hughes, and one of Charles D. Walcott, painted during an eight-week stay in Washington the previous year, were rejected. The sale of another major painting (The Cello Player, 1920–21) to a friend, for $500 in installments, was not enough to enable him to continue as an artist. However, in July 1924, Sawyer's husband arranged to pay Dickinson a monthly salary in exchange for the right to choose paintings of his equivalent in value. This arrangement continued for twenty-one years, ending only when Dickinson secured steady teaching jobs at the Art Students League and Cooper Union in 1945.

In 1928 Dickinson married Frances "Pat" Foley, shortly after the completion of The Fossil Hunters, an 8-foot-high (2.4 m) painting on which he spent 192 sittings and that achieved considerable notoriety when exhibited at the Carnegie International of 1928, because it was hung sideways, a mistake perpetuated by subsequent exhibitions in 1929 at the Pennsylvania Academy of Fine Arts (where the error was caught before the opening) and in New York at the National Academy of Design, where it created an even greater uproar by winning a prize in its disoriented condition.)

Esther Sawyer arranged for the sale of Dickinson's works, especially drawings, portraits, and landscapes to her wealthy friends, and in 1927 she and her husband purchased Dickinson's painting An Anniversary, 1920–21, and donated it to the Albright-Knox Art Gallery. Dickinson devoted more time to his landscapes in the 1930s because they were easier to make and sell than his larger works, which he was having greater difficulty exhibiting in major exhibitions. In a letter to Sawyer in 1933 he wrote that he hoped to live by the landscapes he was painting. In February 1934, he was invited to participate in the first Depression-era program for artists, the half-year Public Works of Art Project, which offered him weekly pay and an exhibition of the painting in Washington in May. He finished the work on time by reworking an abandoned painting, one of a small group done from imagination on a favorite subject, polar exploration, and changing its title to Stranded Brig. The major paintings of this period were Woodland Scene, 1929–1935, which Esther purchased and gave to Cornell University, and Composition with Still Life, 1933–1937, which the Sawyers gave to the Museum of Modern Art in 1952.

A second trip to Europe with his family followed in 1937–38, where he painted landscapes in southern and northern France and visited Rome, Florence, and Venice until concerns about Nazi Germany cut short his stay. While still abroad Dickinson had his first one-person show in New York City at the Passedoit Gallery. It included The Cello Player, The Fossil Hunters, Woodland Scene, Stranded Brig, the recently completed Composition with Still Life (exhibited under its original title, Figures and Still Life), fifteen landscapes sent from France, and fifteen other paintings. It was well covered by art critics, with a generally favorable response. A year after the family's return Dickinson bought a house on Cape Cod in Wellfleet, where they stayed when not teaching in New York.

=== 1943 to 1958 ===
Between 1936 and 1942 Dickinson exhibited annually in the Passedoit Gallery in New York City. This was made possible because he painted no large, time-consuming works between the time he left off work on Composition with Still Life in 1937 and began work on Ruin at Daphne January 1, 1943. The relationship ceased because Dickinson, still struggling to support his family, did not generate enough income from sales and needed to find "earning work". In 1944 he moved the family to New York, believing that it would help him secure a teaching job. During the first year he received some commercial work, including drawings for a French magazine that were rejected and a copy of a photograph of Roosevelt, Churchill, and Chiang Kai-Shek. His wife, Pat Foley, found employment at the Hewitt School that lasted until her retirement in 1966, and in 1945 Dickinson was hired to teach at three schools, beginning a period of teaching that lasted until his retirement, also in 1966.

The other reason for discontinuing the connection with Passedoit was that he wanted time to work on a new painting, Ruin at Daphne, on which he continued to paint, with periodic interludes and lapses in enthusiasm, until 1953, for a total of 447 sittings (about 1341 hours). A donor purchased Ruin at Daphne and gave it to the Metropolitan Museum of Art in 1955. The Whitney Museum of American Art purchased The Fossil Hunters in 1958, and in 1988 the M. H. de Young Museum purchased The Cello Player, the last major painting of Dickinson's to enter a museum (and, along with Ruin at Daphne, one of the few Dickinson paintings usually on view to the general public). In 1948 he was elected into the National Academy of Design as an Associate member, and became a full Academician in 1950.

=== Later years ===
Dickinson remained active as a teacher into the 1960s, by which time his painting output had sharply diminished following the removal of a tubercular lung in 1959 and the increased demands imposed by his growing reputation. These included participation in numerous one-person and group shows, the most important of which were a large retrospective of his work in Boston in 1959, another in New York in 1961 that included 157 works and was reviewed by thirteen critics, followed by an exhibition of his work organized by the Museum of Modern Art that traveled to twelve venues in eleven states, another retrospective at the Whitney Museum of American Art in 1965, covered by nine critics, and inclusion in the American exhibition at the 34th Venice Biennale, where he was the featured painter. Various honors, awards, interviews, and lecture requests followed. There is no record of his having painted after 1963. By 1970 he was displaying symptoms indicative of Alzheimer's disease and died in Provincetown on December 2, 1978.

== Style ==
Dickinson's art, always grounded in representation, has been compared to Surrealism, but the resemblance is superficial. His sensibility and emotional ties lie closer to Romanticism and Symbolism, and he was included in the Museum of Modern Art's 1943 exhibition Romantic Painting in America. But Dickinson generally avoided being grouped in any art movement, which contributed to his being somewhat marginalized, and he adamantly refused to take sides in the controversies between traditional representational painters and the avant-garde artists of the New York School, both groups of whom respected him.

The tendency of his larger works toward monochrome, as well as the darkness of many of them, have also contributed to some observers' bewilderment and disapproval. Another complaint was that the strange juxtapositions and imagery in these works hint at underlying narratives or situations but their purpose is unclear, and Dickinson generally avoided explanation except to describe procedures, technical problems and formal concerns. Even when he mentioned the underlying subject or theme of a painting or identified figures or objects in it, he acted mystified about some of its particulars. But if some observers were frustrated and put off by the elusive character of the large paintings' content others have been moved by them and have attempted explanations to account for the power they experienced. The frequently voiced view among critics, museum directors, and artists that Dickinson deserved greater recognition, led one critic to call him "perhaps America's best-known, underknown artist."

Notable artists who studied under Dickinson include Lennart Anderson, Francis Cunningham, and Denver Lindley.

== Art works ==
=== The Rival Beauties ===
The earliest of what John Driscoll calls Dickinson's "major symbolical paintings", The Rival Beauties, 1915, resembles Ashcan School paintings such as George Bellows's Cliff Dwellers in the crowded humanity that swarms through the space. But in Dickinson's picture many particulars are not brought to completion, and curving lines break free from descriptive duties with their own rhythmic life, most notably the left contour of the white skirt in the foreground that continues upward in the trousers of a doorman standing at attention and in the radically incomplete figure standing before a piano in the left foreground. The piano, inexplicable in an exterior scene, used by a cellist to tune his instrument, seem to signify a tacit approval of Hawthorne's advice: "Real painting is like real music, the correct tones and colors next to each other; the literary and sentimental factors add nothing to its real value." The intentionality of this reference is confirmed by the fact that Hawthorne was himself a cellist. Yet already, in the picture's strange assortment of subjects, including what he intended as a dead horse, Dickinson takes Hawthorne's statement, voicing an idea that was widely accepted in this period, as permission to sabotage narrative coherence by including imagery that defies the observer to account for its presence, a practice that he continued in many of his larger studio paintings.

Driscoll noted that the artist's notation on the back of an old photograph of the painting—"Ref.: Lascado Hern and the Swedish girl friend"—referred to the writer Lafcadio Hearn and argued that it offered a clue to the picture's symbolical content. Ward discovered several entries in Dickinson's journals that identify the Swedish girl friend as Alie Mörling, a fellow art student Dickinson sometimes dined with, who admired Hearn's writings and, as his notation of 3 March 1966 indicates, sent him a note upon Burgess's death, perhaps quoting Hearn. Ward suggests that the picture's title may refer to an essay of Hearn's, "Fair Women and Dark Women," in which he contrasted "the beauty of the Druidess and of the Viking's daughter" with the dark-eyed beauty of the women of Spain, Israel and India. In Dickinson's picture the pair of fair-skinned girls in the center play off against a Latin pair, suggestive of the mixed race Portuguese women of Provincetown, another pair of women in white dresses in the distance, one a redhead and one dark-skinned, and a fourth pair, less distinct, to the left of them with bowed heads that Ward sees as Japanese.

=== Interior ===
In Interior, 1916, Dickinson's most ambitious painting to this point, he again shows the influence of Hawthorne, particularly in his use of the "Hawthorne stare," in which the eyes look toward the viewer but seemed unfocused, as if dreaming, and in the prominently placed bowl, in keeping with Hawthorne's advice to paint white china. But the combination of images defies understanding as a coherent naturalistic description, with six figures packed together in a tight, vertical mass topped by a man in a green mask yelling at a cat he holds up, an action at odds with the introspective mood of the other figures, all of whom, despite their proximity, seem emotionally disconnected from one another. The picture's title does not relate to its setting, but, as Driscoll notes, is almost certainly taken from the title of the 1895 play by Maurice Maeterlinck, performed in New York in 1915, and refers, as does his, to the inner feelings of the characters. Driscoll observes that Maeterinck's play deals with a suicide, and the shared title supports the view that Dickinson's picture is about the death of his brother, represented by the guitarist and also by the screaming figure behind him, who embodies Burgess's interior doubts and uncertainty. Ward suggests that this exploration of psychological states may have been indebted to Edvard Munch and Ibsen, whose play Ghosts he read sometime between 1913 and 1915 and may have associated with his brother's suicide.

=== Inland Lake ===
Although Inland Lake, 1919, is the darkest picture that Dickinson had yet painted, it appears to represent a happy band of women, children, and men—four in sailor's uniforms—at sunset. But the whimsical incident scattered through the picture is offset by a partially merged group or stack of three women to the right of the picture's center, a device not unlike the arrangement and effect of the figures in Interior and one that creates a similarly haunting presence, although embedded in a context that demands greater attention. He painted it two months after his discharge from the navy at war's end at the family cottage at Sheldrake, on Cayuga Lake, where, according to a journal entry written after a visit on leave in 1918, he had had a "happy time". Like The Rival Beauties, it was painted entirely from imagination.

Driscoll did not include it among the major symbolical paintings, and it received little attention until O'Connor and Ward each independently identified it as having symbolic characteristics. Ward points to the contrasting women, one in light-colored clothes welcoming the viewer into the scene, a second, in black, turning away to the left. He sees this pair as representing Dickinson's mother as both alive and dead, leading to a scene both present and remembered. A third woman is visible behind the brightly lit one, seen in right profile, but her contours, hues, and values fit the surrounding context so closely that she seems to disappear and may suggest the dematerialized aura of Dickinson's mother, felt in the surroundings rather than directly observed. Memories of his mother would have been aroused by his return home. By 1922 there is evidence that Dickinson had developed an interest in Marcel Proust, probably in Paris in 1920. While Proust's ideas must have influenced Dickinson's thinking in his later works, his initial enthusiasm was probably aroused because he recognized ideas in the French writer's explorations of memory that already played an important part in his own work.

=== An Anniversary ===
The title of An Anniversary, 1920–21, suggests an event, as do the gestures of the old man and the man with his arm outstretched at the top of the pyramid formed by the picture's three principal figures. But, as in Interior, the densely packed figures appear unaware of each other and the gestures do not contribute to a unified narrative. Only the young, seated woman appears aware of the viewer. Likewise, the objects strung across the bottom of the painting have no narrative purpose. By undermining any coherent narrative, Dickinson frees the observer to experience the picture in terms of its mood and formal interplay and its suggestion of memories evoked by the title (anniversaries were important to Dickinson, who conscientiously noted in his journals the anniversaries of births and deaths of relatives, dear friends, and persons he greatly admired—including Beethoven, Bach, and Proust—as well as American Civil War battles and other major events).

The dark moodiness of the picture suggests an anniversary of a death to Driscoll, who thought it was intended as a memorial to Herbert Groesbeck, the second anniversary of whose death occurred only three weeks after Dickinson began the painting—on his own birthday. He believes that the picture's content may have been colored, if not inspired, by Thomas Hardy's poem "An Anniversary," which declares anniversaries to be "the saddest days of the year" and by John Milton's "Lycidas", a poem Dickinson memorized about this time and often quoted. Milton's subject was the death of a young friend of great promise, as was Dickinson's brother Burgess, and the fear of dying before one's work is done, which Driscoll identifies as also the underlying meaning of Dickinson's painting. The presence of sheet music on the floor and stringed instruments—a violin held by the right hand of the man behind the old man's head and a violin or viola (both of which Dickinson played) held behind his head in the left hand of the standing man—again suggest that Dickinson felt an equivance in the play of forms to musical rhythms and harmonies. The instruments are not being played; the suggestion of music in the painting is expressed through the visual play of form.

O'Connor sees an overriding theme, pertaining to his father's remarriage to a much younger woman following his mother's death, in the symbolical pictures from 1920 to 1928 and in one begun the following year. He interprets the old man in An Anniversary, Two Figures II, The Cello Player, and The Fossil Hunters, and the androgynous woman in Woodland Scene as his aged father, associated in four of the paintings with a young woman and with the cello substituting for a woman in the fifth. The underlying idea that O'Connor proposes is that Edwin, unable in his poverty to marry until 1928, envies his father's happiness and sees him as a rival symbolically laid to rest in The Fossil Hunters by his own new love and marriage less than two months after work on the painting ended. O'Connor argues that the psychological resolution that Dickinson found in The Fossil Hunters he is unable to achieve in Woodland Scene because the symbolic references in it "are to old oedipal states once powerful enough to unify a painting, but now dissipated by his own new and fruitful life."

=== Two Figures II ===
The same model posed for the man in An Anniversary and Two Figures II, 1921–23, again accompanied by a young woman, here appearing more mannequin-like because of her smoothed-out hair and features and her Hawthorne stare. Once again the proximity of the figures, now bunched up on the right side of the picture, sharpens the feeling of their psychological separation from each other that their exclusion from the visual field of their partner's gaze creates. Ward suggests that this lack of interaction, the age difference, the placement of the woman behind the man and to the side of the picture, combined with the contrast between the man's depiction in color and the woman's in monochrome may signify that she is the image of a remembered love, perhaps triggered by the smell of a rose that recalls the remembered smell of one she once held (a hard-to-see stem connects it to her hand). Similarly, the strongly lit head of the old man in An Anniversary and the placement of the other figures behind him may indicate that they are people recollected from his past, seen as they were remembered. If so, the age difference may be because of recollected youth. When Dickinson was seventy, he noted in his journal that he had dreamed of his mother as a young woman.

=== Polar pictures ===
Between 1924 and 1926 Dickinson painted four pictures (one now lost) growing out of his keen interest in polar exploration. His involvement in the subject began with reading Arctic explorer Donald B. MacMillan's book Four Years in the White North. MacMillan was a Provincetown native and Dickinson knew him well. In at least two of the paintings the feeling of melancholic lassitude evident in his larger paintings is gone, replaced by a coherent narrative or scene rooted not in recollection but in the excitement of adventure. However, in one of the paintings, Bible Reading Aboard the Tegetthoff, 1925–26, Ward believes the imagery is more personal. He sees the tipsy, shadowy figures as embroiled in a Manichean struggle between darkness and light, centered on the Bible reader, whom he identified with Dickinson's father, a Presbyterian minister who conducted daily Bible readings at home. He suggests that the feet protruding from a long, curving, cylindrical, dark form descending over them may represent his mother about to be enveloped by death.

=== The Cello Player ===
The fourth of Dickinson's paintings that Driscoll identified as major and symbolical, The Cello Player, 1924–1926, took the longest to paint of works to that date. Again, the dominant figure is an old man, ostensibly playing a cello in a room littered with objects and seen from above, so that the space tips up to a horizon well above the picture top. The progressive tipping and enclosure of space can be observed in the sequence of works leading up to this one, a strategy that parallels modernist tendencies toward pictorial abstraction accompanied by spatial flattening. Nevertheless, the figure and objects in this picture give up none of their volume or tactile presence as objects. Music from a Beethoven quartet in the foreground, and two keyboard instruments at the right, suggest again the equation of painting and music, although the picture's narrative coherence is undermined, with objects positioned not for use but to create visual rhythms and harmonies.

Driscoll sees the painting as a tribute to Beethoven, the composer Dickinson honored above all others, and, through him, to his brother Burgess, a pianist and composer, whom his fellow students at Yale had nicknamed "Beethoven."

=== Girl on Tennis Court ===
A medium-sized painting from imagination with uncharacteristic general use of relatively saturated color, Girl on Tennis Court, 1926, has received little written discussion. It represents a young woman striding boldly forward through patches of shadow that fall across her body and seem to menace her from below. The pose is similar to that of the Nike of Samothrace (with the legs reversed), which he had seen in the Louvre six years earlier and done a drawing of. In 1949 Dickinson tried including the Nike in his Ruin at Daphne (but changed it to a column fragment), and bought a reproduction of the sculpture. Ward notes that Dickinson first describes the picture he is beginning as "comp. of Sheldrake tennis ct" and believes that the inspiration for the painting may have been his sight of a girl at that location, moving in a pose that recalled his memory of the ancient Nike.

=== The Fossil Hunters ===
The Fossil Hunters, 1926–1928, contains the most explicit references to Dickinson's early life and loved ones. The title refers to the fossils that Dickinson had searched for as a child in Sheldrake, and again while visiting in the summer of 1926 before starting work on the painting. Dickinson may well have intended the painting to be a means of "rescuing" his brother Burgess through art: a death mask of Beethoven is depicted, but with eyes open, unlike the actual death mask. Dickinson opened the eyes in his painting, and in so doing, not only immortalized his brother, but gave him back the life he remembered him having.

Adler sees the old man as holding a stick (a symbolic paintbrush) to the grindstone as expressing the artist's "'labor' to give birth to something eternal", and the reference to a hunt for fossils referring to this desire to leave behind remains that will survive death. Dickinson himself admitted that the desire to make something as lasting as the work of the old masters was manifested in the size of the work (at 96 1/2 inches (2,450 mm) high it was the largest painting he had done).

=== Andrée's Balloon (The Glen) ===
Ward is the only writer to publish an interpretation of Andrée's Balloon, 1929–1930. The picture is a curious one, begun on his honeymoon at the Dickinson cottage in Wellfleet, yet remarkably menacing for a happy bridegroom to paint. It is not obvious what changes Dickinson made to the picture in the seventeen months he worked on it, but the prolonged time—five months longer than it took him to paint An Anniversary, despite being only 30 1/4 by 25 3/16 inches (768 mm × 640 mm)—indicates the importance he gave it—and the struggle he had with finishing it to his satisfaction. Originally titled The Glen, it was renamed after the body and diary of the Swedish polar explorer Salomon August Andrée was found in 1930, but not before 1933, when he still referred to the picture by its original title and identified it as "[t]he one with the balloon at the top." The presence of the balloon in the originally titled painting Dickinson explains as referring to a memory of a balloon ascent from his childhood evidently awakened by his stay with his new bride at the family cottage. Ward points out that the terrain is that of the region, has nothing to do with the arctic environment where Andrée's party perished, and the picture was renamed without being repainted. He compares it with another painting of the balloon ascent, The Finger Lakes, 1940, and contrasts the soft, romantic mood and style of that painting with the menacing character of the earlier work, with shadows that appear to rise from the earth and the wildly swinging gondola of the balloon. Ward interprets the character of The Glen as arising from the conflict between his incomplete mourning for his mother and his love for his bride, which he is able to resolve in the later painting.

=== Woodland Scene ===
The struggle to bring a picture to completion experienced in The Glen continued in Woodland Scene, 1929–1935, on which he spent nearly four hundred sittings and twice changed the dimensions of (the seam attaching a strip of canvas on the left is just visible to the left of the inverted figure's shoulder; another strip he attached at the top was later removed and the right side was narrowed by 3 1/4 inches (83 mm)). Driscoll believed Dickinson's dissatisfaction with the picture, which he finally finished for his patron, made complete interpretation difficult. The one he offered links the sitter's stoic acceptance of her difficult situation after her husband's death with passages from Thomas Hardy's book The Woodlanders and his poem "In a Wood," in which Hardy portrays nature as engaged in a death struggle. Driscoll believes that Dickinson identifies with the subject's inner strength in facing disappointment and adversity. Ward cautions against trying to interpret the picture in terms of the sitter's biography; he notes that another sitter had originally posed for the seated figure, and both worked as models that Dickinson had used before.

Ward observes that this painting, like The Fossil Hunters, suggests the imagery of a dream, with its darkness, its floating figure, and the strange, mouthless figure who confronts the viewer. Ward suggests that the mouthless women that appear in several Dickinson paintings may refer to his mother, whom he can visualize, but cannot hear from. One is also struck by the contrast between the heavy coat on this figure and the nudity of the figure on the right who, except for her breast and right upper leg, is largely blanketed in smoke from a fire burning where her head would be, a contrast that Ward relates to the "burning passion of youth and the cold loneliness of old age". In the original picture, with more canvas on the right and less on the left, these figures would have been balanced against each other, and Ward believes, as in The Glen, that the picture represented Dickinson's struggle to reconcile the mourning he continued to do for his mother with the love he felt for his bride, a conflict that contributed to his inability to finish the painting in a way that satisfied him even after almost six years. He interprets the floating figure as the mother as he remembers her, with the rose, equated with a breast as a symbol of motherly love, and visually connected to the old woman's loins by the plow handle, as if it traced the path of her resurrection.

=== Stranded Brig (Loss of the Tegethoff) ===
According to Ward, Dickinson's painting for the Public Works of Art Project, Stranded Brig, 1934, had begun life as Loss of the Tegethoff, the third painting of a series on the subject of the stranding of that ship in polar ice, left off after about 15 sittings in the fall of 1930. In the final version the ice has disappeared and upended rocks resembling those he had painted in The Glen are present. The picture also contains the skeleton of a whaleboat in the foreground, along with an improbable weasel caught in a trap (lower left), falling rocks (left side), and a dangling walkway and steps. These details reinforce the idea of a situation without escape. Biographical events may have contributed to Dickinson's feelings: he had a bout with ulcers in 1933; he experienced back pains bad enough to wear a back brace from June 1931 until after Stranded Brig was complete; and on July 1, 1934 he entered the hospital for a battery of tests. The tests were inconclusive, but Dickinson's daughter believes the problem was depression, a family problem that had led to the death of his brother, and was perhaps exacerbated by his still-unresolved struggle with Woodland Scene, on which he had at that time spent five and a half years.

=== Shiloh ===
In the summer of 1932 Dickinson took a break from painting Woodland Scene and began a painting of a Civil War subject, Shiloh, 1932–33; revised 1940, 1963, the title already decided upon (but not the dimensions, which were later reduced from 50 by 40 inches (1,300 mm × 1,000 mm) to 36 by 32 inches (910 mm × 810 mm)). The painting originally contained two figures, the artist, sporting a beard grown for the occasion) and Bruce McCain, who was shown beneath a blanket except for his head and shoes, but the head (and a shoe, if McCain's memory is accurate) disappeared, evidently when the painting's size was reduced (although the top is the only original edge). As in The Fossil Hunters, the blanket was introduced at least in part for the formal play of its folds and has nothing to do with the subject, an especially bloody battle. The painting is the first indication of Dickinson's interest in the Civil War, a subject that his brother Howard had a great interest in, as did Edwin thereafter. Dickinson posed for his head lying on his back and looking at an overhead mirror. But the body was painted from a lay figure dressed in the uniform.

Adler observed that "to paint oneself as dead means to identify with the dead", and compared Dickinson's head in Shiloh to that of Count Orgaz in El Greco's painting. The visual resemblance is not strong, but in 1949 Dickinson told Elaine de Kooning, "When I saw the Burial of Count Orgaz, I knew where my aspirations lay." Consequently, it is entirely plausible that he may have thought of that painting in planning a picture dealing directly with death. Ward suggests that Dickinson very likely identified with the death of his brother, whose body he discovered when looking out his apartment window, or that of Herbert Groesbeck, with whom he had tried to enlist in World War I. He notes that the painting indicates no interest in the specifics of the historical battle. Although perhaps inspired by photographs of dead Civil War soldiers that his brother may have shown him, Dickinson transformed his subject into a highly personal statement about death.

=== Composition with Still Life ===
In November 1933 Dickinson decided to pause work on Woodland Scene, which he had been unable to bring to a satisfactory resolution, and began a new painting—his largest—that he eventually gave the neutral name of Composition with Still Life, 1933–1937. Work progressed steadily in 1934, except for the period Dickinson worked on Stranded Brig, followed by his hospitalization, and for two months at the beginning of 1935, when he finished up work on Woodland Scene at Esther's request. Dickinson put the painting aside in June 1935, after receiving word that his eldest brother, Howard, had been murdered in Detroit. He did little work on the painting until May 1936, and finished it November 1, 1937.

Adler found Composition with Still Life especially difficult to interpret, but thought it suggested "a picture of journey's end or of the last harbor". Driscoll recognizes water symbolism suggestive of disaster and death at sea in the imagery and relates it to shipwrecks that occurred in Provincetown, some of which he witnessed. Ward suggests that Composition with Still Life is the Dickinson work most explicitly presented as a dream through the combination of solid, detailed forms with passages that melt into gaseous substances or dissolve into one another.

=== Portraits ===
Dickinson painted portraits throughout his career, ranging from the self-portrait of 1914 to a portrait of Susanne Moss that he began in 1963 (remarkably, the only carefully delineated feature of either painting is the right eye, recalling Hawthorne's advice to "stop while it is still right, ... no matter how little ... is done"). The painted portraits he painted on commission tended not to be well received; even the charming portrait of Esther Sawyer's children was accepted only after he repainted "Sister." As a result, he did not attempt many of them. In 1930 and 1931 Esther arranged for Dickinson to draw portraits of about a dozen persons, all of which seem to have been accepted, but none of which have been reproduced or exhibited, in contrast to the one he did at this time of her daughter as a surprise gift to her. Some of the portraits, such as Barbara Brown, 1926, and one of his fiancé, Portrait of Francis Foley, 1927, involved numerous sittings. Others, such as Evangeline, 1942, or Carol Cleworth, 1959, were done in fewer sittings and were left off with parts not fully delineated, but at a point when he believed that they would not improve with further work. Still others, such as Martha, 1942, and Shirley, 1945, were treated as premier coups, done in one sitting.

Dickinson told Carol Gruber in 1957-58 that he had done about 28 self-portraits over the span of his career, of which most had been lost or destroyed. Only eleven self-portraits (including Shiloh) are known to exist at present; Self-Portrait [Nude Torso], 1941, Self-Portrait, 1923 (charcoal on paper), and Self-Portrait in Homburg Hat, 1947, are known from photographs; a self-portrait (La Grippe), painted in 1916 while ill, burned up in a fire; a self-portrait 20 by 16 inches (510 mm × 410 mm) is known only from a journal entry of 19 September 1943; another is noted in his journal as having been scraped off to reuse the canvas for a painting of a beach house, which he painted out after two days in favor of the architectural fantasy that eventually became Ruin at Daphne. No record exists of the others he mentioned, some of which may have been lost or beginnings that he scraped off, or he may have exaggerated the number. But even the sixteen self-portraits that can be substantiated as having been attempted constitute a body of work comparable with that of artists known for their self-portraits, such as Dürer, Rembrandt, and Van Gogh. Of the documented self-portraits, nine were painted in the period 1940-43.

Dickinson thought that Self-Portrait (1941), with a French villa in the background, a black stovepipe framing his right shoulder, and a dark cloud engulfing, but not darkening his head, was his best. The cry he lets out recalls the yell of the figure in the green mask in Interior and seems to reflect his emotional condition—less healthy and optimistic than usual—as he later admitted. The financial struggle to subsist, combined with his helpless feeling that the nation was being drawn into a war he strongly opposed contributed to his emotional state. Dickinson's interest in the Civil War certainly suggested the uniform in Self-Portrait in Uniform, 1942. But the entry of the United States into World War II less than one month before the painting was begun was probably its impetus. Ward sees the gaze, which addresses the observer, as a reproach for allowing the nation to slide into a new war, and the uniform a reminder of the terrible toll the Civil War took on the nation. At the same time, the inclusion of the American flag is a declaration that he is a loyal American, and the uniform is a reminder of his own service. His daughter relates that, because he was bearded and was seen drawing and painting on the beach, rumors spread in 1941 that he was a German spy mapping the terrain, an idea that was not yet squelched in 1943, despite an appeal to the American Legion to intervene on his behalf. The absence of a weapon is notable, especially in light of the fact that four days before beginning the painting he listed in his journal his collection of six army rifles of roughly World War I vintage. Ward suggests that, since he served as a telegraph operator in the Navy, the bugle acts as an equivalent means of sending a message, specifically the message of his distress as a loyal American over our being drawn into a new World War.

During the period in which Dickinson painted the greatest number of self-portraits, he also painted Still Life with Microscope, 1941. Little known or reproduced, it has the uncanny presence of a ghostly self-portrait. As Ward observes, the microscope floats in a dark envelope that in shape and position approximates Dickinson's head as it appears in portraits such as Self-Portrait in Uniform and Self-Portrait in Gray Shirt, 1943, while the darker areas that set off the bottom of the picture sit beneath this shape like a supporting torso, turned toward the right. The microscope, purchased at the same time he read Microbe Hunters, serves as the figure's symbolic eyes, and its orientation reinforces the perceived rotation of the figure's head and shoulders. The darkness in which the microscope hovers also relates to the dark pool in which Dickinson's head sits in the Self-Portrait with French villa, also of 1941 and the darkness of his Self-Portrait head of 1914.

Dickinson's Self-Portrait of 1949 differs from his others in being a profile portrait, achieved by the use of two mirrors. It was painted to give to the National Academy of Design as a condition of his admission to associate membership, and its character reflects that purpose. Ward suggests that Dickinson presents himself as an academician, the profile view indicative of the timeless essence of the man, with a perspective diagram behind him demonstrating command of the rules of pictorial space construction, and his arm raised in the creation of the picture in which he appears (uniquely among his self-portraits). But small patches of paint destabilize depicted surfaces as if to suggest that the perceived world is in continuous flux as the mind structures shifting perceptions. Self-Portrait, 1950, is a remnant of a half-length, nude self-portrait that once included a vase he cut out and gave to the National Academy of Design when they granted him full membership. The frontal head, dramatically lit, partially obscured by a shingle, with mouth open as if speaking, beard windswept, furrowed brow, and with a body seemingly confined, appears overpowered by circumstances beyond his control. No events in his life can be related with certainty to the expressive effect of this picture, but a notation in his journal links a life-threatening fall of his aged father to concerns about his own changing condition. These concerns were realized in 1953, when Dickinson spent most of the summer in the hospital, where he was operated on for an abscess followed by a bout with undulant fever. His wife was operated on in January 1954, and three weeks later and three days before the anniversary of his brother's death, he began his last Self-Portrait. As in the portrait of 1950, his arms appear confined, but in place of the flashing eye and teeth in the earlier work these openings are shown as dark holes, and a heavy ledge appears to bear down on his head. The image is of a heroic figure suffering anguish and defeat.

=== Ruin at Daphne ===
Dickinson's major painting of the 1940s, a work that he worked on between 1943 and 1953, was Ruin at Daphne, inspired by the Roman ruins that had impressed him on his European visit. Dickinson wanted to dedicate the picture to his brother Burgess, an intention he had harbored long before the painting began. On a canvas covered with a red-brown ground, he began a detailed perspective drawing in pencil that he then modeled with three values of the red-brown paint. He was excited about the challenge posed by having to invent the buildings, which permitted him compositional freedom to indulge in a complex interplay of form much like that permitted to a purely abstract painter.

In 1949, Elaine de Kooning wrote an article on the painting for ARTnews, illustrated with photographs documenting its progression through various alterations and transformations. The article had a significant role in gaining wider recognition for Dickinson. Only in early 1952 did Dickinson finally begin to overpaint the preliminary reds and pinks in which he had worked out the picture's design. Working from the center outwards, he had only painted perhaps 30 per cent of the canvas in the new, off-gray color when, in 1954, while the painting was being moved to an exhibition, a gust of wind caught it, knocking over the men who were carrying it and tearing a hole in the lower right corner. A restorer repaired the hole but applied a coat of heavy varnish to the entire painting that interfered with further work.

=== South Wellfleet Inn ===
Dickinson worked on one final major painting, South Wellfleet Inn, 1955–1960. In later years Dickinson gave 1950 as the date for the painting's beginning, but on August 2, 1955, he wrote in his journal, "Began a 44 5/8 × 33 1/4 of the South Wellfleet Inn," giving, as he usually did, the measurement of the width first. Based on a drawing that he had made of the building in 1939 before it burned down, and a premier coup that he painted in 1951 of a scene that included part of the painting of the scene, with a second canvas with a depiction of the scene visible on the first depicted canvas. South Wellfleet Inn carries this idea further: it depicts the inn partially obscured by a canvas on which is painted a series of diminishing canvases and inns collapsing in upon themselves in infinite regress, slipping backward on the left and twisting downward at an accelerated rate on the right. Remarkably, the inclusion of the painting in the depicted scene sets off a chain reaction in which the apparently objective pictorial record has the effect of reenacting the hotel's collapse in fire sixteen years earlier. It has been suggested that the picture's imagery also symbolically reenacts the death of his mother and the brother whom he idolized, who jumped from Dickinson's sixth-floor apartment window. This idea is also supported by the photograph of a "cure cottage" such as the one in which his mother died at the Saranac Lake tuberculosis sanatarium behind the grimly forbidding windows of the upper story, a memory of which may have been awakened by the inn's upper windows.

=== Smaller works ===
Examples of very small premier coup paintings exist from Dickinson's student days, both in Chase's still life class, such as The Book, 1911, and from his study with Hawthorne, such as O'Neil's Wharf, 1913. But the average size of his paintings increased in the 1920s and '30s—even the premier coups, which represent a much smaller part of his output in the 1920s and early 1930s—to somewhere between 20 by 25 inches (510 mm × 640 mm) to 30 by 35 inches (760 mm × 890 mm) (excluding his large studio paintings). Landscapes of this size, often premier coups, increased in the 1930s, with the greatest production occurring in France in 1937–38, when he was not working on a large painting.

The style of his works varies in relation to size and date, with the smallest or the earliest done du premier coup more to train his eye and to learn to paint without preconception, as Hawthorne advised, or to get down information to use in a larger work; the somewhat larger ones he tended to work on longer and bring to a higher state of resolution. But this generalization is breached, for example, in the carefully composed Bulkhead Brace, 1913, 12 by 16 inches (300 mm × 410 mm), which, despite both an early date and small size (most often associated, as in that work, with heavy impasto applied with a palette knife), appears fully resolved. An exception on the other end of the size range is Toward Mrs. Driscoll's, 1928, 50 by 40 inches (1,300 mm × 1,000 mm), which is a premier coup. The impastoed paintings of 1913–1914, such as House, Mozart Avenue, 1913, and Self-Portrait, 1914, with occasional notes of fully saturated hues, are indebted to Hawthorne's teaching, but impasto, bright notes of color, and the sense of urgency in execution is still evident in paintings such as View from 46 Pearl Street, 1923, and Back of Harry Campbell's Studio, 1924. Dickinson continued the use of a palette knife, even in the large paintings, but gradually made greater use of brushes and thinner paint. In 1938 he wrote from France that many of the paintings he did then were painted "with the hand only". This practice continued in his later paintings. Denver Lindley, a student of Dickinson in the mid-1950s, said "His favorite tool was the little finger of his right hand. His smock was covered with paint on the right side because he wiped his finger on it."

Dickinson painted some more fully finished, somewhat larger landscapes in the later 1920s, such as Cliffs Longnook, 1927, and Parker's Cliffs, 1929, the former a gift to his sister Antoinette (Tibi), and the latter to his father and his second wife, Louise (Luty). But toward the middle of the 1930s a blurring of edges, softening of forms, and often greater luminosity can be observed throughout his work, including his drawings. This change occurs in works that are done quickly and with great urgency, which increase in number, including landscapes and marine pieces such as Rocks and Water, La Cride, 1938, and some of his portraits, such as Evangeline, 1942. But it may also be observed in drawings such as South Wellfleet Inn, and Roses, both 1939, and in his larger studio paintings, where blurred areas are combined with more resolved details, as in the 40 × 50 inch Stranded Brig, 1934, and the large Composition with Still Life, 1933–37.

Over time, Dickinson's small paintings and drawings tended to converge in style. Premier coup paintings evolve from early works with forms constructed in thick impasto to later ones with a generally thinner use of paint and hazier forms, but he continued the practice of building forms in paint patches rather than first drawing contours. By contrast, Dickinson's early drawings rely on firm contours and subtly nuanced shading to define clearly articulated forms, a style that gains greater economy and power from his study in Paris, as seen in Nude (Standing Nude, Hips and Legs), 1920, and in Esther Hill Sawyer, 1931, and then softens in the drawings of the 1930s (Nude #3, 1936). The drawings and premier coup paintings of this period, apparently so different from his large, time-consuming studio paintings, often share with them the quality of the Freudian uncanny that Iverson found in Edward Hopper's work, a quality to which the hazy luminosity contributes. Examples are the premier coups Villa in the Woods, 1938, White Boat, 1941, and the drawing Nude No. 5, Shoulder, 1936, and from 1950, Rock, Cape Poge.

Dickinson's paintings of the 1940s are on average substantially smaller than in any period since his student days, and even in the 1950s most are no large than 23 by 20 inches (580 mm × 510 mm). This was done partly with the idea that they could be sold more cheaply (and thus more often) and were easier to carry in the field, partly because he was giving much of his time to painting Ruin at Daphne and teaching, and in the 1950s because he was limited by health problems. In some of his later work, in particular Ruin at Daphne, South Wellfleet Inn, the 12-by-14 1/2-inch (300 mm × 370 mm) Carousel Bridge, Paris, 1952, and his Self-Portrait of 1949, Dickinson showed a greater interest in perspective construction and careful execution. But he still painted pictures du premier coup, including Through Two Cottage Windows, 1948, and his painting perhaps most difficult to perceive as anything but abstract shapes, Quarry, Riverdale, 1953.
