= Aisha Tandiwe Bell =

American visual artist

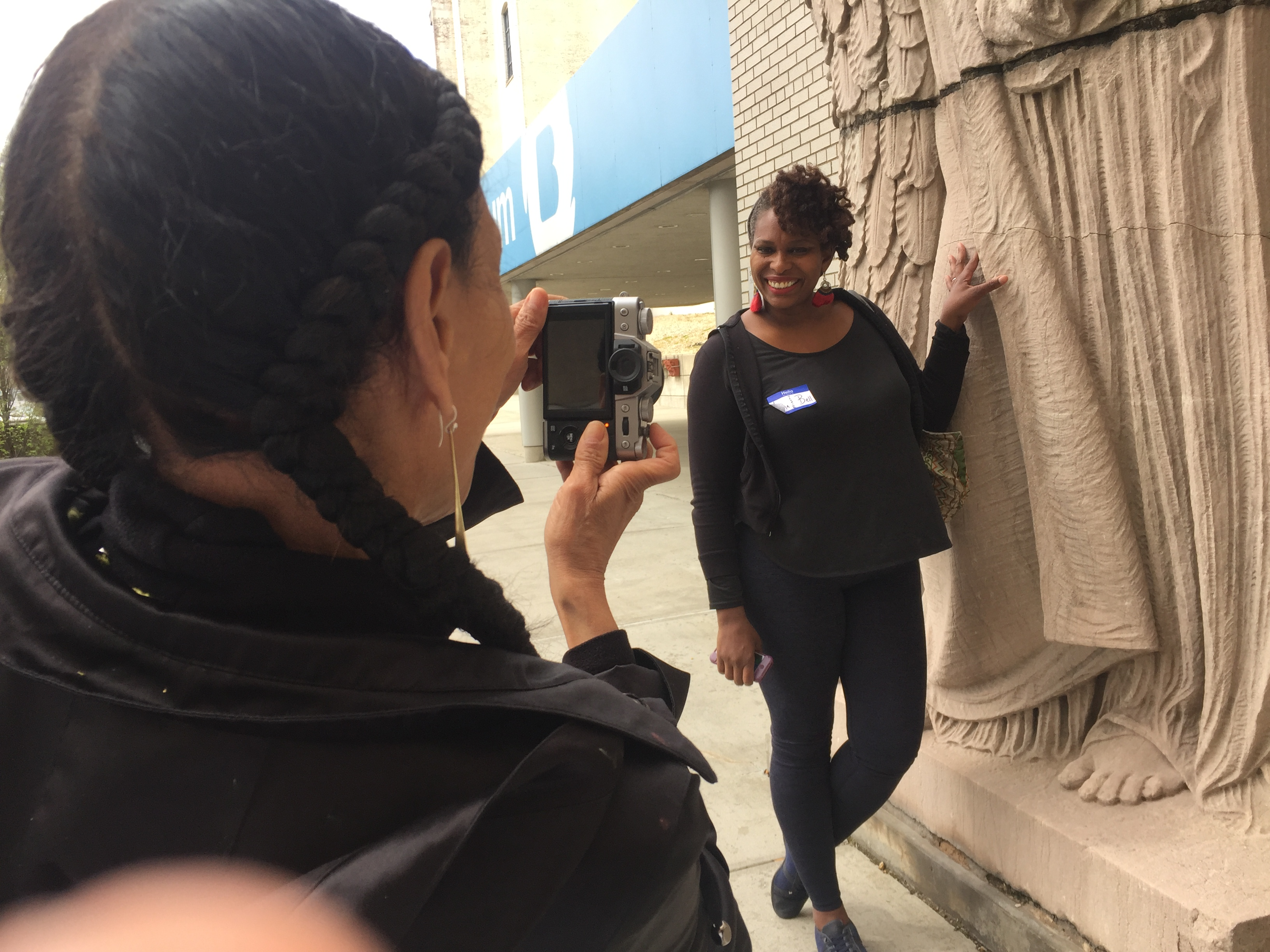
- Artist Ming Smith photographing artist Bell at Brooklyn Museum during Black Lunch Table in honor of We Wanted a Revolution: Black Radical Women, 1965–1985
- Born: New York City, U.S.
- Education: BFA, Pratt Institute; MS Pratt Institute; MFA Hunter College
- Occupation: Visual artist
- Style: Mixed media artist
- Website: Artist website Twitter account

Aisha Tandiwe Bell is an American visual artist known for her work that creates myth and ritual through mixed media including sculpture performance, video, sound, drawing, and installation that addresses themes of fragmentation, shape-shifting, code-switching, hyphenated identities and multiple consciousness, marginalization, and lack of agency people in the African Diaspora struggle with. Through her mixed media, Bell's art focuses on and looks at the societal constraints of sex, race, and class. She uses each piece of her art to look at the norms that society has created around sex, race, and class and the limitations that people have placed upon themselves when it comes to these ideas. As a Jamaican-American woman in the United States, Bell uses her art to represent the displacement that she feels and the alter egos that black women have to uphold publicly and privately. The sculptures that Bell creates are intentionally cracked, fragmented, and imperfect to reflect her fractured identity.

== Biography ==
Bell was born and resides in New York City. She is a recipient of the 2017 DVCAI International Cultural Exchange to Guadeloupe. Bell has completed a number of residencies/ fellowships, including Skowhegan, Rush Corridor Gallery, Abron's Art Center, LMCC's Swing Space, The Laundromat Project, BRIC, Hunter College Ceramic Residency in 2013 and as the Artist-In-Residence in 2010 at Abron's Art Center Henry Street Settlement in New York, NY.

== Exhibitions ==
=== 2017 ===
- CONJURE, Welencora Gallery, Brooklyn, NY, curated by Derrick Adams
- Body and Soul, Venice Biennial, Venice Italy, curated by Elga Wimmer
- A prerequisite for Rebellion, Ann Arbor Film Festival, Ann Arbor, MI, curated by Ingrid Lafleur
- Jamaica Biennial 2017 National Gallery, Kinston, Jamaica

=== 2016 ===
- BRIC Biennial, Brooklyn, New York
- Let them eat red earth. Let them eat dirt, Space One Eleven, Birmingham, AL, curated by Rosie Gordan-Wallace
- Space One Eleven AIR, Birmingham, AL

=== 2015 ===
- [MoCADA], Museum of Contemporary Art of Contemporary African Diaspora Arts, Brooklyn, NY

=== 2012 ===
- The Laundromat Project Public Art Commission, NY

=== 2002 ===
- Skylight Gallery at Restoration Plaza, Jamaica, NY
