= Blair doroshwalther =

American documentary filmmaker

blair doroshwalther
- Education: New York University Tisch School of the Arts; Fordham University
- Occupations: Filmmaker; social worker
- Awards: Guggenheim Fellowship (2016)

blair doroshwalther, also known as blair dorosh-walther (both stylized in lowercase), is an American documentary director and producer. A 2016 Guggenheim Fellow, they (Note: Although doroshwalther preferred he/him and she/her pronouns as of 2015, with several sources inconsistently using either, by 2024 doroshwalther preferred they/them and he/him pronouns, with the former being used consistently throughout an Urban Resource Institute press release announcing doroshwalther's appointment as director of the Economic Empowerment Program. This article uses they/them for consistency.) directed Out in the Night (2014) and produced After Sherman (2022).

== Life and career ==
doroshwalther attended New York University Tisch School of the Arts, where they were part of the spring 2003 documentary film program, won the Adam Balsano Award at NYU TIsch's First Run Film Festival, received a nomination for the Directors Guild of America East Coast Female Student Filmmaker Award, and obtained her BFA in Film and Television in 2004.

doroshwalther directed and produced the 2014 documentary Out in the Night. Focusing on the 2006 Greenwich Village assault case, it was doroshwalther's directorial debut. It premiered at the 2014 Los Angeles Film Festival, and it won several awards including Best Documentary Feature Film at 2014 ImageOut and Best Documentary Award at 2015 Perlen – Queer Film Festival Hannover, as well as a selection for the United Nations Free & Equal Global Film Series. It aired on the PBS series POV on June 22, 2015. Diane Anderson-Minshall of The Advocate said that "thanks to blair dorosh-walther's skills, there's a lot for a cinephile to love about Out in the Night".

In 2016, doroshwalther was awarded a Guggenheim Fellowship in Film and Video. They later began development on a second film, Inherently Unequal, based on the Lawrence Goldstone's book of the same name. They were one of the producers for the 2022 film After Sherman.

doroshwalther is a member of the New Day Films cooperative.

In the 2000s, doroshwalther began working in adult care in order to support their career. They received their Master of Social Work degree from Fordham University in 2021. As a social worker, doroshwalther co-authored the report Reinvesting in Economic Justice, Equity and Solidarity for Survivors in New York City. In 2024, they became director of Urban Resource Institute Economic Empowerment Program, and they and two other URI executives wrote an op-ed to City Limits in support of survivors of financial abuse. They have also been quoted in several news articles on financial abuse in her capacity as a social worker.

doroshwalther is gender non-conforming and, as of 2016, lived in Newburgh, New York.

== Filmography ==
Year	Work	Note	Ref
2014	Out in the Night	Director and producer	
2022	After Sherman	Producer	
