= William Howell =

William Howell may refer to:

== Law and politics ==
- William Thompson Howell (1810–1870), American jurist and politician
- William Tudor Howell (1862–1911), British politician, MP for Denbigh Boroughs
- William Barberie Howell (1865–1927), American judge for the U.S. Customs Court
- William J. Howell (born 1943), American politician
- William G. Howell (born 1971), American political scientist

== Sports ==
- William Howell (rugby union) (born 1863), Welsh rugby union player
- William Howell (Barbadian cricketer) (1866-1958), Barbadian cricketer
- William Howell (cricketer, born 1883) (1883–1960), New Zealand cricketer
- William Howell (cricketer, born 1902) (1902–1987), Australian cricketer

== Others ==
- William D. Howell (1797–1836), American surgeon who died as a defender of the Alamo
- William Roe Howell (1846–1890), American photographer
- William Henry Howell (1860–1945), American physiologist
- William Devin Howell (born 1970), American serial killer
- William R. Howell, American businessman

== See also ==
- Bill Howell (disambiguation)
- William Howells (disambiguation)
