= Bill Howell =

Bill Howell may refer to:

- Bill Howell (architect) (1922–1974), British architect
- Bill Howell (cricketer) (William Peter Howell, 1869–1940), Australian cricketer
- Bill Howell (American football) (Wilfred Daniel Howell, 1905–1981), American football player
- Bill Howell (politician) (William James Howell, born 1943), Speaker of the Virginia House of Delegates
- Bill Howell (graphic designer), American graphic designer, artist, set designer and photographer

== See also ==
- William Howell (disambiguation)
