= Beny Primm =

American physician

- Born: May 21, 1928; United States
- Died: October 16, 2015 (aged 87); United States
- Education: B.S. (1950), West Virginia State College; M.D. (1959), University of Geneva
- Medical career
- Profession: Doctor
- Field: Anesthesiology, Substance abuse, HIV/AIDS research
- Institutions: Harlem Hospital; Addiction Research and Treatment Corporation; Urban Resource Institute; Office of Treatment Improvement

Beny Jene Primm (May 21, 1928 – October 16, 2015) was a prominent American physician, HIV/AIDS researcher, lecturer, and advocate for public health policy reform.

Primm was born in Williamson, West Virginia, and earned his Bachelor of Science from West Virginia State College in 1950, before moving to Europe to undertake graduate studies at the University of Heidelberg in Germany and the University of Geneva in Switzerland, earning his Doctor of Medicine from the latter in 1959.

In 1963, Primm began working as an anesthesiologist at Harlem Hospital, and during this time he began to specialise in drug addiction treatment and prevention. In 1969, he co-founded the Addiction Research and Treatment Corporation (A.R.T.C.) in New York, which opened six branches as well as a treatment centre in Brooklyn. A major project of the A.R.T.C. was to determine the safety and effectiveness of methadone as a substitute for heroin, to help addicts recover. Primm combined this treatment with social and psychiatric services. In 1981 he founded the Urban Resource Institute, an organisation offering career counselling and human resources for drug addicts.

Primm was a leading figure in the fight against HIV/AIDS during the 80s, and an early proponent of preventative measures such as clean needle programs, personal HIV/AIDS status testing, and safe sex. From 1987, he served on the Presidential Commission on the Human Immunodeficiency Virus Epidemic under Ronald Reagan, where he personally added to the commission's 600-point plan of action a recommendation for treatment to be given on demand to intravenous drug users.

Primm was later appointed to the National Drug Abuse Advisory Council, and headed the Office of Treatment Improvement, an agency of the government's Alcohol, Drug Abuse, and Mental Health Administration. He also served on the Presidential Advisory Council on HIV/AIDS.

Primm was not only an advocate for public health reform but also for civil rights and equality. In 2014, the year before his death, he released his memoir, which he co-authored with John S. Friedman, entitled The Healer: A Doctor’s Crusade Against Addiction and AIDS.
