= Kay Brown (artist) =

American painter (1932–2012)

- Born: 1932; New York City
- Died: 2012 (aged 79–80); Washington, D.C.
- Known for: Painting; Printmaking; Collage
- Movement: Black Arts Movement

Kay Brown (1932–2012) was an African American artist, Printmaker, published author, Graphic and Fashion designer. She graduated at New York City College in 1968, with a Bachelor of Fine Arts degree. She was also a graduate at Howard University in 1986 with a Master of Fine Arts degree. Brown became the first woman awarded a membership into the Weusi Artist Collective, based in Harlem during the 1960s and 1970s. The Weusi Collective, named for the Swahili word for “blackness”, was founded in 1965, composed entirely of men. The fact that she was the only female member of this collective inspired her to seek out ways of representing the neglected Black female artists. She is widely acknowledged as one of the founders of the Where We At Black women artists' collective in New York City. Brown's works are credited for representing issues that affected the global Black community via her mixed media collages and prints. Brown's work was featured in the "We Wanted a Revolution" exhibition at the Brooklyn Museum.

== Career ==
Brown coupled with fiber artist Dindga McCannon and formed "Where We At" Black Women Artists, Inc. (WWA) during the spring of 1971. Topics covered through artistic expression within this organization were contemporary social conditions such as the Black female/male relationship, African traditions, and the Black family as a unit. She also wrote an article based on her involvement in the Exhibition and how she contribute to it. Brown also wrote a young adult novel, Willy's Summer Dream, which was published in 1989. Ms. Brown was also a published author of two novels. The novel that is largely discussed is Willy’s Summer Dream, inspired by the life of her only son. Her son is also noted in part as the inspiration for her “Black Mother and Male Child” etching. Brown was a staff member at the Medgar Evers College and an assistant professor at the Anne Arundel Community College from 1989 to 1990. Brown's work was a part of the Black Arts Movement which was a collaboration of black artists, visual artists musicians, and poets.

Vertical files for Kay Brown are in the Evans-Tibbs Collection of the National Gallery of Art Library. Her image is included in the iconic 1972 poster Some Living American Women Artists by Mary Beth Edelson.

== Works ==
Kay Brown was a sociopolitical printmaker specializing in the expressions of the Black narrative she witnessed personally. Brown also used large format collages to help express her agenda.

- The Black Soldier, 1969 – This piece was inspired by the increased number of Black men being drafted and volunteering in the Vietnam War from November 1955 until April 1975. Brown uses the images of Martin Luther King Jr. as a central focal point while the images of Black young men soldiers surrounds his image. She states that the reasoning behind this is to convey that the war's reasoning was unknown to its participants and recognize that Black soldiers were just mass casualties and of no value. To support her ideology she places the image of a man representing the Black Panther Party in the lower right-hand corner to represent Americas lack of protection for the Black community and the need for militant self-protection.
- Willowbrook, 1972 – (Etching and aquatint on paper) Brown chooses within this print to convey a sorrowful scene found in the cross hatching along the table and the emphasis on the window that solidifies the solitude felt when caged in and the bewilderedness children and adults find themselves when being throw into failing mental illness facilities. Willowbrook is a mental institution in Staten Island infamously known for the mistreatment, child abuse, and inhumane treatment of its residents that were revealed in the 1970s.
- First Kick of Life (Color etching and aquatint on paper, c. 1974) – in the collection of the Brooklyn Museum.
- Black Mother and Male Child (Etching and aquatint on cream woven paper, 1974–1975) — Brown's heavy usage of line variation makes this etching dynamic and textured, emphasizing the emotional warm worryful embrace of a mother embracing her son.
- Every time I Feel the Spirit (Etching, 1979) – exhibited in the exhibition Transformations: Women in Art 70's–80's, at the New York Coliseum, March 5–9, 1981
- The Devil and His Game (paper and acrylic paint on canvas, 1970) – exhibited in the exhibition Tradition and Conflict: Images of a Turbulent Decade, 1963–1973, at the Studio Museum in Harlem, January 27–June 30, 1985.
- Sister Alone in a Rented Room (Etching on paper, 1974). Brown uses etching to create a scene that shows the women in the picture the struggles in poverty.
- Meditation (Etching and aquatint on paper) In this painting it shows a woman figure on the ground, who looks like she's sad. She uses a lot details on figure's dress and on the body.

There have been some articles where she has been mentioned. According to Mutual Art, Kay Brown has been featured in articles for the AnOther, and the ArtDaily (According to MutualArt). Also, according to Mutual Art, in August 2020, her most recent article was Women Artists of Colour in the Spotlight of Wiki Edit-A-Thon written for the H A P P E N I N G.

== Exhibitions ==
Her work can be seen in multiple exhibitions, which can be found at several galleries and museums.

- Blackness in Color: Visual Expressions of the Black Arts Movement, 1960-Present, Herbert F. Johnson Museum of Art, Cornell University, August–October, 2000
- Transformations: Women in Art 70's–80's, New York Coliseum, March 5–9, 1981
- We Wanted a Revolution: Black Radical Women, 1965–85, Brooklyn Museum, April 21–September, 2017
- We Wanted a Revolution: Black Radical Women, 1965–85, California African American Museum, October 13, 2017 – January 14, 2018
- We Wanted a Revolution: Black Radical Women, 1965–85, Albright-Knox Gallery, February 17, 2018 – May 27, 2018
- Arroyo Arts Collective: Discovery Arts Pop-Up, Los Angeles, Nov 10, 2018 – Dec 01, 2018
- Where we at: Black Women Artists, 1971
