= Where We At =

American artist collective for Black women

"Where We At" Black Women Artists, Inc. (WWA) was a collective of Black women artists affiliated with the Black Arts Movement of the 1960s and 1970s. It included artists such as Dindga McCannon, Kay Brown, Faith Ringgold, Carol Blank, Jerri Crooks, Charlotte Kâ (Richardson), and Gylbert Coker. Where We At was formed in the spring of 1971 after an exhibition of the same name organized by 14 Black women artists at the Acts of Art Gallery in Greenwich Village. Themes such as the unity of the Black family, Black female independence and embodiment, Black male-female relationships, contemporary social conditions, and African traditions were central to the work of the WWA artists. The group was intended to serve as a source of empowerment for African-American women, allowing them to control their self-representation and explore issues of Black women's sensibility and aesthetics. Like AfriCobra, a Chicago-based Black Arts group, the WWA actively fostered art within the African-American community and used it as a tool of awareness and liberation. The group organized workshops in schools, jails and prisons, hospitals, cultural centers, and art classes for youth in their communities.

== Context ==
In the 1960s, in the wake of the Civil Rights Movement and Black Arts Movement, the work of African-American artists began to gain more attention in the mainstream art world. However, many Black women artists felt neglected by both the male-dominated Black Arts Movement, the largely White Feminist art movement, as well as the mainstream art world. While several individual female artists, including Elizabeth Catlett, Faith Ringgold, Inge Hardison, Lois Mailou Jones, and Betye Saar, gained national attention, most practicing Black women artists in New York found it difficult to find venues for their work in White-run galleries and museums. The initial Where We At: Black Women Artists exhibition and the collective of the same name that later formed were created to address this neglect.

== Where We At: Black Women Artists: 1971 ==
In 1971, "Where We At"—Black Women Artists was perhaps the first Black women's professional artists show in New York, only preceded nationally by an exhibition held the previous year entitled Sapphire Show: You've Come a Long Way Baby at the artist Suzanne Jackson's Gallery 32 in Los Angeles. WWA was held at the Acts of Art Gallery (1969–74) owned by Nigel Jackson located on Charles Street in the West Village. In one of the few detailed accounts available of the history of this group, WWA artist and founder Kay Brown describes the development of WWA and its connections with the Black Arts Movement. Brown began working with the Black Arts-affiliated Weusi Artist Collective in 1968. The Weusi artists had recently founded the Nyuma Ya Sanaa Gallery ("house of art" in Swahili), which they later renamed the Weusi Academy of Art, in Harlem. With the Weusi artists, Brown developed her painting techniques and learned the craft of relief printmaking and mixed-media collage. She also learned about the developing conception of a "Black aesthetic" that had become an important project for the Black Arts Movement. Influenced by this search for a "Black aesthetic," she began developing a philosophy based on African traditions. The group was conscious of the inherent overlap of Black and female identities. So, as the exhibit was the first focusing on the Black woman's perspective, there was pressure to construct a feminine aesthetic within the Black American art vernacular.

Although Weusi had previously had a few Black women members, including textile artist Dindga McCannon, when Brown joined, she was the only female member in what was frequently referred to as "a brotherhood" of 14 men. Although she states in her essay that she felt "honored" to be included in the group, she also felt the need for an "affirmation" of Black women artists. In 1971, Brown and McCannon, Faith Ringgold, and others discussed the possibility of a major exhibition of Black women artists. As a response to what was commonly referred to in the group as the "Whitney fiasco" (the Whitney Museum of American Art's first major exhibition of Black artists, which became extremely controversial in the Black community, who saw it as sensationalizing and exploitative, rather than a sincere recognition of the artists' talent) artist Nigel Jackson had opened the Acts of Art Gallery in Greenwich Village as an exhibition space for the works of Black artists. When Brown and her fellow Black women artists presented Jackson with a proposal for a show of work of 14 Black women, he agreed to host it. The show, entitled Where We At: Black Women Artists: 1971, is often cited as the first group show of Black women artists ever held, though an exhibition precedes it held the previous year at Gallery 32 in Los Angeles featuring organizer Suzanne Jackson, Gloria Bohanon, Betye Saar, Senga Nengudi (then Sue Irons), and Eileen Nelson (then Abudulrashid). It was funded by the Brooklyn Educational and Cultural Alliance, the New York State Council on the Arts, the Presbyterian Church Committee for the Self Development of People and America the Beautiful Foundation. According to Brown, the show's title emphasized the artists' ties to the "grassroots" community. It referred to a general "earthiness" to the show, as demonstrated by the fact that at the exhibition's opening, the artists served cooked food to the visitors, departing from the traditional wine and cheese.

The show was popular and met with critical acclaim. Brown identifies the perceived success of the exhibition as a motivating factor in the artists' decision to form a collective of the same name: the "Where We At" Black Women Artists, Inc. (WWA). Developing a set of bylaws and electing officers, the founding members established an official organization. Brown served as president and executive director, and as a team, the group took on the responsibility of targeting various sites for WWA art exhibitions.

== Projects ==
WWA engaged in many projects, including a panel of women artists at the Brooklyn Museum in conjunction with David Driskell's landmark exhibition, Two Centuries of Black American Art, and a seminar for Women's International Year at Medgar Evers College.

In the fall of 1978, WWA held art workshops for inmates at the Bedford Hills Correctional Facility for Women. According to artist Kay Brown, "The women inmates loved expressing themselves creatively in classes with professional Black women artists. It was as if a beautiful ray of sunshine had appeared in the darkness. Someone really cared about us!" WWA sometimes worked in conjunction with Women and Student Artists For Black Art Liberation, an organization that often worked out of Rikers Island prison systems. The WWA also led workshops at the Arthur Kill Correctional Facility for men, as well as in hospitals and cultural centers. In addition, the WWA created an apprenticeship workshop for youth in Brooklyn that taught graphic design, illustration, and media skills, as well as painting, ceramics, crochet, and macramé.

WWA also published "Where We At" Black Women Artists: A Tapestry of Many Fine Threads, a widely circulated brochure describing the history and mission of the organization, which consisted at one point of 30 women, with a foreword by Linda Cousins.

Members of WWA contributed to publications including the Feminist Art Journal and Heresies: A Feminist Publication on Art and Politics.

== Shows with male artists ==
Though they were often excluded from important conversations around Black Liberation and were subjected to misogyny by many peers who were Black men, they still often felt a stronger allegiance to the Black arts movement over the existing and predominately White feminist art movement.

In the 1970s and 1980s, WWA artists collaborated with male artists on several projects. In the winter of 1972, they held the Cookin' and Smokin exhibition at the Weusi-Nyumba Ya Sanaa Gallery (later the Weusi Academy of Art). A short time afterward, the Black psychologist Kenneth Clark presented WWA at the M.A.R.C. gallery.

In 1985, WWA teamed up with the "brothers" of Weusi to create the collaborative exhibit Close Connections at 1199 Gallery in midtown. In the show, Black men and women worked together on a single thematic project.

The next major WWA show, Joining Forces: 1 + 1 = 3, which opened in June 1986 at the Muse Community Museum in Brooklyn, was a collaborative installation of the WWA and a group of invited male artists. It was curated by Charles Abramson and Senga Nengudi-Fittz. The show consisted of three-dimensional works produced by male/ female artist "couples" who met over three months and engaged in an "artistic and platonic mating ritual." The two artists were expected to reach a consensus on how to compose the work visually, and the entire exhibition had to unite as a unified whole. "1 + 1 = 3" was an erotic symbol that suggested a process of male and female entities coming together to create something that "went beyond the normal vocabulary to make an entity of a third thing."

The close spiritual connection of one couple, Charlotte Richardson and Lorenzo Pace, who had previously been casual acquaintances, was captured by Coreen Simpson, a photographer and exhibiting artist, who recorded the couples as they interacted during the design. Her photographs, the Spirits series, were published in WWA's exhibition brochure.

== The WWA and "Women's Liberation" ==
Although, according to Kay Brown, WWA members, and other Black women artists agreed with feminist activists on many issues, such as the idea that women should pursue economic and artistic equity with men, Brown felt that WWA artists generally felt more aligned with the Black Arts Movement than with "Women's Liberation", which they felt was dominated by "liberal White women." According to Brown, there were as many tensions between the Black and White women's community at that time as between Black and White men. Brown notes that "Our [Black women's] struggle was primarily against racial discrimination -- not singularly against sexism. We were not prepared to alienate ourselves from our artist brothers." However, many well-established and influential Black artists of the period, such as Howardena Pindell, a founding member of A.I.R. Gallery, did choose to align themselves with feminism or to maintain connections with both mainstream feminist groups as well as groups oriented towards women of color.

According to Brown, the tensions between the Black and White women's communities were evident in a series of joint exhibitions produced by the National Conference of Women in Visual Arts (NCWVA) and the WWA artists at selected showplaces in Greenwich Village, SoHo, the East Village, and the midtown area. The exhibition series was intended to demonstrate a form of "unity" between all women artists independent of race, age, or class. However, it soon became apparent to Brown and other African-American participants that the goals and ideology of the feminist-identified and WWA artists were different. According to Brown, "The feminist artists focused totally on sexism, often in a flagrant, bizarre fashion. The Black women artists explored the unity of the Black family, the ideal of the Black male-female relation, and other themes relating to social conditions and African traditions."

== Early WWA members ==
Early WWA artists included:

- Carol Blank
- Kay Brown
- Vivian Browne
- Carole Byard
- Janette Burrows
- Gylbert Coker
- Jerrolyn Crooks deGracia
- Iris Crump
- Pat Davis
- Linda Hiwot
- Doris Kane
- Mai Mai Leabua
- Dindga McCannon
- Onnie Millar
- Faith Ringgold
- Charlotte Richardson
- Modu Tanzania
- Ann Tanksley
- Jean Taylor

== Other members ==
Other members included:

- Brenda Branch
- Linda Cousins
- Asiba Danso
- Dimitra
- Jeanne Downer
- Miriam Francis
- Claudia Gibson-Hunter
- Rafala Green
- Deidre Harris
- Claudia Hutchinson
- Crystal McKenzie
- Stella McKeown
- Marie Morris
- Madeline Nelson
- Millie Pilgrim
- Hurtha Robinson
- Akweke Singho
- Saeeda Stanley
- Gail Steele
- Joan Stevens
- Priscilla Taylor
- Ann Wallace
- Joyce Wellman

== Exhibition sites ==
WWA exhibition sites included:

- Medgar Evers College
- Studio Museum in Harlem
- Stonybrook University
- Brooklyn Museum
- New York Public Theater
- Hofstra College
- Metropolitan Museum of Art
- Martin Luther King Gallery
- Bed-Stuy Restoration Gallery
- Benin Gallery
- NY State Office Bldg in Harlem
- NY Arts Consortium
- Women's Interstate Center
- BACA's Downtown Gallery

WWA artists also participated in the National Conference of Artists meeting at Jackson, Mississippi, Carifesta in Guyana in 1972, and the pan-African FESTAC in Nigeria (1977).

The WWA was also included in WACK! Art and the Feminist Revolution, the first comprehensive, historical exhibition to examine the international foundations and legacy of feminist art. The show appeared at the Museum of Contemporary Art, Los Angeles, and P.S.1 Contemporary Art Center, New York.

== Bibliography ==
- Brodsky, Judith K. (1994). The Power of Feminist Art: The American Movement of the 1970s, History and Impact. H.N. Abrams. pp. 106–107. ISBN 978-0-8109-3732-1.
- Linda Theung, "'Where We At' Black Women Artists," in Butler, Cornelia H, and Lisa G. Mark. Wack!: Art and the Feminist Revolution. Los Angeles: The Museum of Contemporary Art, 2007. Print.
