= We Wanted a Revolution: Black Radical Women, 1965–1985 =

2017 exhibition held at the Brooklyn Museum of Art

We Wanted a Revolution: Black Radical Women, 1965–85 was an exhibition held at the Brooklyn Museum of Art from April 21, 2017, to September 17, 2017, surveying the last twenty years of black female art. The exhibition was organized thematically, presenting forty artists and activists whose work was dedicated to the fight against racism, sexism, homophobia, and class injustice.

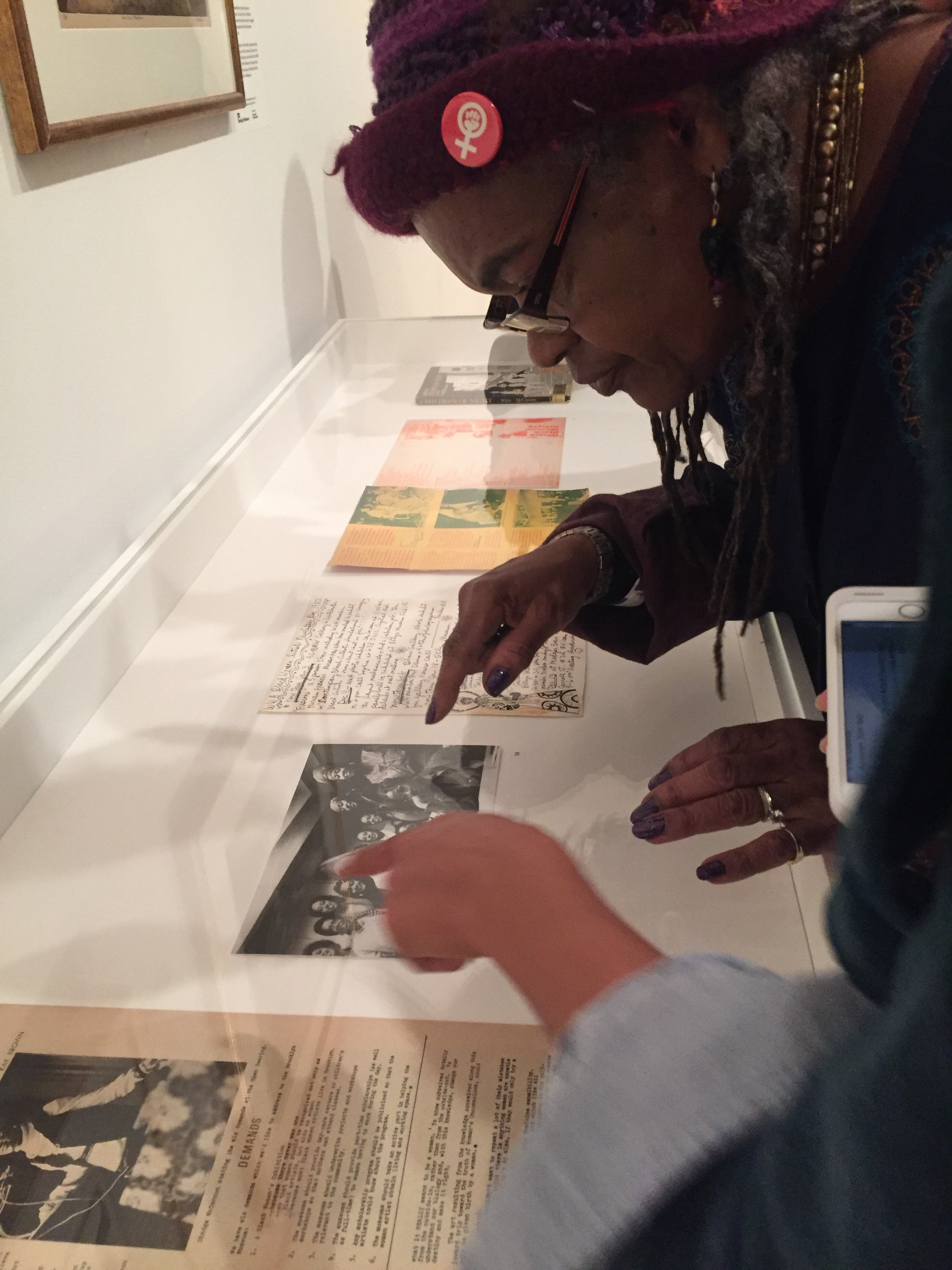
Black Lunch Table: We Wanted A Revolution Roundtable. Dindga McCannon explains her work and her archive at the Brooklyn Museum at the exhibition We Wanted a Revolution: Black Radical Women, 1965–85 after a roundtable discussion with other black women artists at the Black Lunch Table event.

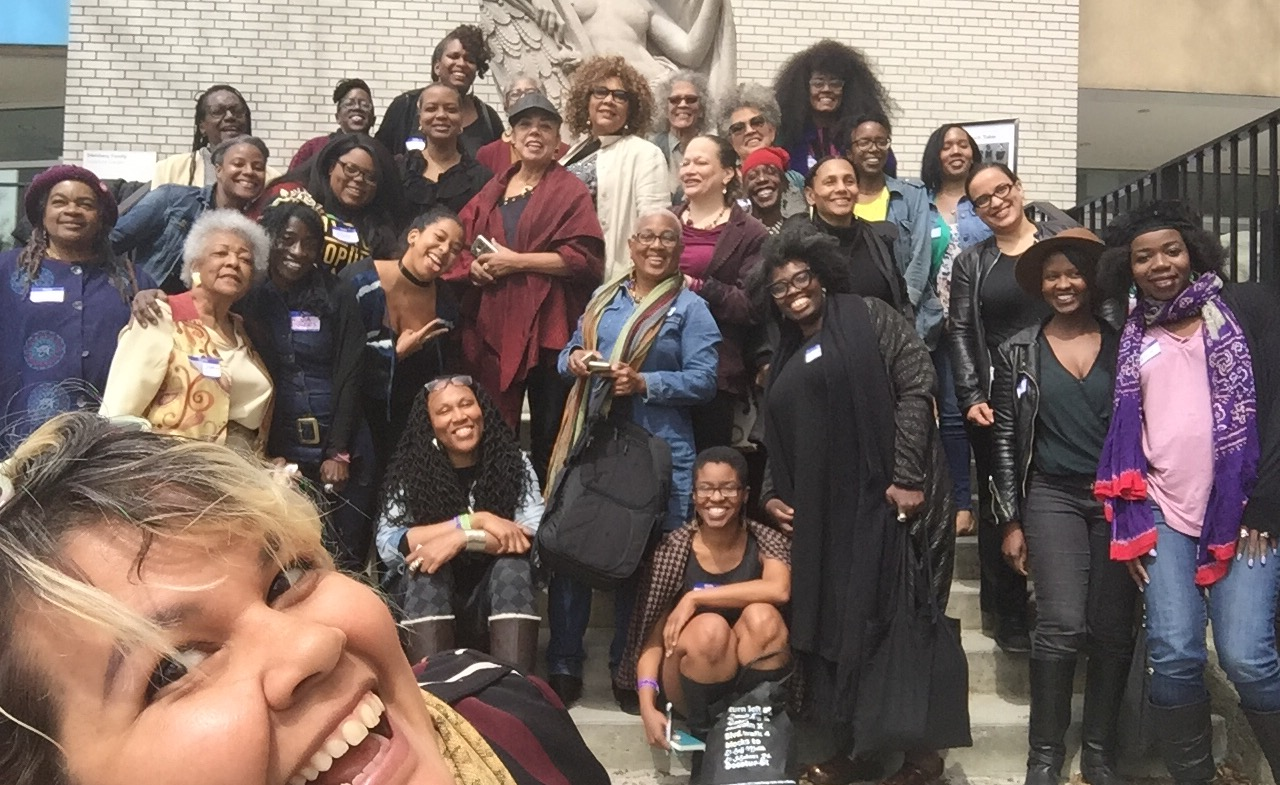
Black Lunch Table: We Wanted A Revolution Roundtable. Women visual artists of the African Diaspora meet at the Brooklyn Museum to discuss their work.

== The structure of the exhibition ==
We Wanted a Revolution: Black Radical Women, 1965–85 was presented by the Elizabeth A. Sackler Center for Feminist Art at the Brooklyn Museum, organized by Senior Curator Catherine Morris, former Assistant Curator of Contemporary Art Rujeko Hockley, with curatorial assistant Allie Rickard. The exhibition was part of A Year of Yes: Reimagining Feminism at the Brooklyn Museum, a year-long series of exhibitions celebrating the 10th anniversary of the Elizabeth A. Sackler Center for Feminist Art. Leadership support was provided by Elizabeth A. Sackler, the Ford Foundation, the Stavros Niarchos Foundation, Anne Klein, the Calvin Klein Family Foundation, the Institute of Museum and Library Services, Mary Jo, Ted Shen, and an anonymous donor. Financial support was also provided by Annette Blum, the Taylor Foundation, the Antonia and Vladimir Kulaev Cultural Heritage Fund, Beth Dozoretz, The Cowles Charitable Trust, and Almine Rech Gallery.

Among the diverse media showcased were conceptual art, performance, film, video, printmaking, photography, and painting. Despite substantial distinctions between these mediums, the exhibition's overarching objective of amplifying the voices of Black female artists and shedding light on the oppression faced by Black female or non-binary artists within the art world and broader culture unified the showcased artworks. We Wanted a Revolution encompassed nine sections, each dedicated to a particular theme or medium.

== Artists and movements ==
=== Spiral and the Black Arts Movement ===
Spiral is a group of Black artists that was active between 1963 and 1965. It was formed by Romare Bearden, Norman Lewis, Hale Woodruff and Charles Alston on July 5, 1963.

==== Emma Amos, born 1938 ====
Emma Amos was born in Atlanta, Georgia, in 1938. She is an African-American postmodernist painter and printmaker. Some of her works were exhibited, including:

- Flower Sniffer, 1966
- Sandy and Her Husband, 1973

==== Elizabeth Catlett, 1915–2012 ====
Elizabeth Catlett was a Mexican-American Modernist sculptor whose subject matter was often concentrated on black female experience. Catlett was born in Washington, D.C.

- Homage to My Young Black Sisters, 1968

==== Jeff Donaldson, 1932–2004 ====
Jeff Donaldson was an African-American visual artist of the Black Arts Movement.

- Wives of Shango, 1969
- "Africobra: African Commune of Bad Relevant Artists; 10 in Search of a Nation", Black World 19, no. 12 (October 1970)

==== Rudy Irwin (Baba Kachenga), d. 1969 ====
- WEUSI Art Creators, undated

==== Jae Jarrell, born 1935 ====
- Ebony Family, 1968
- Urban Wall Suit, 1969

==== Wadsworth A. Jarrell, born 1929 ====
- Revolutionary, 1971

==== Lois Mailou Jones, 1905–1998 ====
- Ode to Kinshasa, 1972
- Ubi Girl from Tai Region, 1972

==== Lary Neal, 1937–1981 ====
- "Any Day Now: Black Art and Black Liberation", Ebony (August 1969)

==== Faith Ringgold, born 1930 ====
- Early Works #25: Self-Portrait, 1965

==== Jeanne Siegel, 1929–2013 ====
- "Why Spiral?" Artnews 65, no.5 (September 1966)
- First Group Showing: Works in Black and White, 1963
- Jet, 1971
- Weusi Group Portrait, 1970s

=== Prints and posters ===
==== Emma Amos, born 1938 ====
- Summer 1968, 1968

==== Kay Brown, 1932–2012 ====
- Sister with Braids, the late 1960s – early 1970s
- Willowbrook, 1972

==== Elizabeth Catlett, 1915–2012 ====
- Malcolm X Speaks for Us, 1969
- Harriet, 1975
- There Is a Woman in Every Color, 1975
- Madonna, 1982

==== Barbara Jones-Hogu, born 1938 ====
- I'm Better Than These Motherfuckers, 1970
- Nation Time, 1970
- Relate to Your Heritage, 1971
- Unite, 1971
- Black Men We Need You, 1971

==== Carolyn Lawrence, born 1940 ====
- Uphold Your Men, 1971

==== Samella Lewis, born 1924 ====
- Family, 1967
- Field, 1968

=== "Where We At" Black Women Artists ===
==== Kay Brown, 1932–2012 ====
- "Where We At' Black Women Artists". Feminist Art Journal 1, no. 1 (April 1972)
- Kick of Life, 1974
- She Sees No Evil; She Hears No Evil; She Speaks No Evil, 1982
- Sister Alone in a Rented Room, undated

==== Carole Byard, 1941–2017 ====
- Yasmina and the Moon, 1975

==== Pat Davis ====
- "Where We At' Black Women Artists" digital C-print, 1980

==== Pat Minardi, born 1942 ====
- "Open Hearing at Brooklyn Museum", Feminist Art Journal (April 1972)

==== Dinga McCannon, born 1947 ====
- Revolutionary Sister, 1971
- Morning After, 1973
- Empress Akweke, 1975

==== "Where We At" Black Women Artists Inc., founded 1971 ====
- Cookin' and Smokin', 1972
- "Where We At": A Tribe of Black Women Artists, 1973
- "Where We At" Black Women Artists Letterhead, 1980

=== Black feminism ===
Among the participants in the section were:

- James Baldwin, 1924–1987
- Audre Lorde, 1934–1992
- Lorraine Bethel
- Barbara Smith (activist), born 1946
- Vivian E. Browne, 1929–1993
- Elizabeth Catlett, 1915–2012
- Claudia Chapline, born 1930
- Barbara Chase-Rebound, born 1939
- Maren Hassinger, born 1947
- Leonard Levitt, born 1941
- Samella Lewis, born 1924
- Toni Morrison, born 1931
- Faith Ringgold, born 1930
- Bettye Saar, born 1926
- Margaret Sloan, 1947–2004
- Gloria Steinem, born 1934
- Alice Walker, born in 1944
- Michele Wallace, born 1952

=== Art world activism ===
Among the participants in the section were:

- The Committee to Defend the Judson Three, founded in 1971
- Flo Kennedy, 1916–2000
- Gerald Lefcourt, born 1941
- Robert Projansky
- Pat Mainardi, born 1942
- Black Emergency Cultural Coalition, founded in 1969
- Linda Goode Bryant, 1949
- Carol Duncan, born 1936
- Grace Glueck, born 1926
- Janet Henry, born 1947
- Luce R. Lippard, born 1937
- Donald Newman, born 1955
- Howardena Pindell, born 1943
- James Reinish
- Ingrid Sischy, (born in South Africa, 1952–2015)
- Helen Winer, born 1946
- Faith Ringgold, born 1930
- Jan Van Raay, born 1942
- Michele Wallace, born 1952
- Women Artists in Revolution, founded in 1969
- Ad Hoc Women Artists' Committee, founded 1970
- Women Students and Artists for Black Art Liberation, founded in 1970

== Public programs ==
Symposium was held at the Brooklyn Museum of Art on April 21, 2017. As a part of the exhibition events, the art historian Kellie Jones, author and feminist theory scholar Aruna D'Souza, and Black cultural studies academic Uri McMillan gave speeches and participated in a panel discussion.

== Reception and criticism ==
The exhibition was covered by several magazines. The New York Times' main critique was that the selection of artists was rather one-sided and narrow, which is why many prominent black artists remained unrepresented.

The only change I would make, apart from adding more artists, would be to tweak its title: I’d edit it down to its opening phrase and put that in the present tense.. — Holland Cotter (The New York Times)

The New Yorker presented a short response for the exhibition:

The several dozen artists whose work is featured in this superlative survey did not conform to one style, but they did share urgent concerns, often addressing issues of bias and exclusion in their art—and in their art-world organizing. The Just Above Midtown Gallery (JAM), a crucial New York institution of the black avant-garde, was instrumental to the careers of a number of them, including Lorraine O’Grady, whose sardonic pageant gown made of countless white gloves—the artist wore it in guerrilla performances at gallery openings—is a wonder. There is much powerful photography on view, from Ming Smith’s spontaneous portraits of Harlemites in the seventies to Lorna Simpson and Carrie Mae Weems’s poignant pairings of image and text, from the eighties. But the ephemera—the fascinating documentation and spirited newsletters—provide the exhibition’s glue, presenting the women not as anomalous achievers but as part of a formidable movement. — The New Yorker

== Publications ==
Two books were published as a part of the scholarship program for the exhibition.

=== Black Radical Women, 1965–85: A Sourcebook ===
The book was first published in 2017 as an exhibition catalog. It contains thirty-eight reproductions of articles, poems, interviews, and other texts by or about the artists of the exhibition. The book provides the reader with the perspectives of black female art and Black culture in general that were most prioritized by the exhibition. The publication was intended for scholars or students of art history; however, it is accessible to a general reader.

== Sponsorship and funding ==
The exhibition was funded by the Ford Foundation, the Elizabeth A. Sackler Foundation, the Brooklyn Museum’s Contemporary Art Acquisitions Committee, the Andy Warhol Foundation for the Visual Arts, The Shelley & Donald Rubin Foundation, and the Barbara Lee Family Foundation.
