= Bill Howell (graphic designer) =

American art director and graphic designer

- Born: September 12, 1942; Jefferson City, Tennessee, United States
- Died: July 25, 1975 (aged 32); New York City, New York State, United States
- Education: Philadelphia College of Art
- Known for: Weusi Artist Collective; Pajoma Studio Gallery
- Movement: Black Arts Movement

William Lowell Howell (September 12, 1942 – July 25, 1975) was a graphic designer, painter, illustrator, set designer and photographer. He was an early member of the Weusi Artist Collective, a group of artists who helped birth the Black Arts Movement in the 1960s. He was art director for The New Lafayette Theatre in New York and its Black Theater magazine. He co-founded the Pamoja Studio Gallery in New York in 1967.

== Early life and education ==
Howell was born September 12, 1942, in Jefferson City, Tennessee. He moved with his family to Wilmington, Delaware, when he was in high school. He attended the Philadelphia College of Art (now University of the Arts) from 1960 to 1962.

== Art career ==
In 1961, Howell worked his first graphics job at Lyons Advertising Studio in Wilmington. A commercial artist, he was art director at J.M. Fields Co. Inc. department store.

Howell moved to New York around 1965 or 1966. He and artists Ademola Olugebefola and Abdullah Aziz formed Arts Seven while living at the Amsterdam Houses near the Lincoln Center. They later moved to Harlem where they joined the Twentieth Century Creators, a group formed in 1964 by artists from New York and surrounding areas. The same year, the group organized the first Harlem Outdoor Art Festival. The group disbanded after members differed on its philosophy and direction.

=== Weusi Artist Collective ===
In 1965, several artists formed Weusi, which means “black” in Swahili. The group ascribed to the idea of Black art for Black people and Black power, aligning themselves with artists who were focusing on their own Black culture and African heritage. The group formed at a time when very few museums hosted exhibits by Black artists. Howell was one of the early members of Weusi. The Weusi artists primarily produced black and white prints that could be readily distributed and sold. Howell participated in Weusi’s community shows in the 1960s and 1970s, as well as exhibits at Weusi’s own gallery, the Weusi Nyumba Ya Sanaa Art Gallery. Howell exhibited with other Weusi artists at their “Resurrection” exhibition, which was held at the Studio Museum in Harlem in 1970. This was the group's first exhibition at a major museum.

=== Pamoja Studio Gallery ===
In 1967, Howell founded Pamoja Studio Gallery with Bob Davis and Ollie Johnson. The gallery was located in Greenwich Village in New York, eliciting a mention in Jet magazine that described them as “soul” owners. It was formed in the “spirit of Weusi and we looked at it as our downtown branch,” stated Olugebefola. Weusi had opened its own gallery the same year, Nyumba Ya Sanaa Gallery, in Harlem.

Howell designed the poster for Pamoja, the face of a Black woman in a large afro.

=== Graphic design ===
Howell’s work as a painter and graphic designer were intertwined. As art director of The New Lafayette Theatre, he designed programs, posters and sets. His drawings were interspersed throughout Black Theater magazine. He also designed posters and catalogs for some of the exhibits in which he participated. He worked at the Philadelphia Museum of Art as director of “Mind’s Eye,” a children’s art program with a mobile unit and exhibition.

Howell was a “brilliant graphic designer,” said Olugebefola, one of Weusi founders. “He helped produce some of the most phenomenal posters. That was one of the exemplary things that the New Lafayette did. We produced six Black theater magazines over the years; I was directly involved with three; Bill Howell was involved with at least two of those before he passed away. … Bill designed (the New Lafayette) posters To Raise the Dead and to Foretell the Future, Goin’ a Buffalo, The Devil Catchers, A Ritual to Bind Together and Strengthen Black People so that They Can Survive the Long Struggle that Is to Come – and others, all wonderful designs.”

In the 1960s, Howell was one of a handful of black graphic designers in the country. PRINT magazine wrote an article about the scarcity and Howell was quoted extensively. In the article, Howell stated that he was hired for his first graphics job with the assistance of the NAACP. It was an apprentice job that allowed him to learn about advertising design and gain exposure to the industry. The article noted that Howell and other Black designers had begun to focus on their ethnic heritage in their works.

=== Solo and group shows ===
Howell was a painter, illustrator, set designer and photographer. He exhibited widely in New York and other cities on the East Coast. While living in New York in 1968, he returned to Wilmington to hold a benefit art show for youths. He returned in 1973 for a solo show at the Gallery at Centerville.

He participated in the exhibit “New Black Artists” in October 1969 at the Brooklyn Institute of Arts and Sciences Museum (Brooklyn Museum of Art) and then at Columbia University a month later. He designed the poster for the university show. In 1970, Howell was part of major exhibit of Black artists titled “Afro-American Artists New York and Boston” at the Boston Museum of Fine Arts.

Howell was among the artists featured in an exhibit of graphics and films by Black men and women in New York at the Studio Museum in Harlem in 1970. Organizers said it was aimed at showing the creativity of African Americans in advertising and publishing agencies.

In 1971 he was among 60 artists from across the country in an exhibit of paintings, drawings, sculptures and graphics sponsored by Illinois Bell in Chicago. The exhibit traveled to seven cities in Illinois, Indiana and Iowa.

Also in 1971, he was one of the "prominent" artists whose works were shown at the National Center of Afro-American Artists in Boston in an exhibit called “TCB,” or taking care of business. A reviewer for the Boston Globe described the artwork of Howell and seven other Black artists as “raging … pointing up how it feels to be black in the US today. Some of the paintings are angry indeed. Yet anguish, compassion and a pride in being black mitigates the fury.” The reviewer noted that the average age of the artists was 30 and the works exemplified social protest.

In 1975, he participated in the exhibit “Spirits of Forgotten Ancestors” in March 1975 at the Walnut Street Theatre. The multimedia show featured five contemporary artists with Africa as the inspiration. Howell contributed four paintings from his “Nuba” series, inspired by Africa’s Nuba people. The exhibit was sponsored by the Philadelphia Museum of Art. Howell designed the poster and program for the show.

Howell showed off his creativity with photography in a 1972 show titled “The Expanded Photograph,” whose catalog and poster he designed. The exhibit was sponsored by the Philadelphia Museum of Art and the Philadelphia Civic Center Museum. He also created posters for the Philadelphia Museum of Art's Inner-City Cultural Arts Festival in 1974.

He was among five artists in an exhibit “Five Phases” at the Delaware Art Museum in 1972 that highlighted Philadelphia artists. The show had previously been shown at the Studio Museum in Harlem and the Ile-Ife Museum of Afro-American Life and Culture in Philadelphia.

Befitting the aim of Weusi to bring art into the community, Howell participated in showings and sales at private homes, including a garden party by the Links social club in 1975 and another in a private home in Brooklyn's Bedford Stuyvesant in 1972. A newspaper article from 1970 noted that he had received an award a year earlier at the Brooklyn Museum’s Fence Art Show – where artwork was displayed on a fence around the parking lot - sponsored by the museum.

Howell designed the program for a Weusi exhibit at the Opportunities Industrialization Center offices in New York in 1971.

== Collections ==
Some of Howell’s personal papers, catalogs, photographs, documents and other materials are in the collection of Emory University’s Stuart A. Rose Manuscript, Archives, and Rare Book Library in Atlanta. He is represented in many private collections.

== Exhibitions ==
Howell's exhibitions during his career include:

- 1967: Countee Cullen Branch of the New York Public Library;
- 1969: Brooklyn Museum of Art;
- 1969: Columbia University;
- 1970: Visual Arts Gallery, New York;
- 1970: School of Visual Arts, New York;
- 1970: Boston Museum of Fine Arts, Boston;
- 1970: Rhode Island School of Design, Rhode Island;
- 1971: Opportunities Industrialization Centers, New York;
- 1971: Studio Museum in Harlem, New York;
- 1971: Illinois Bell, Chicago;
- 1971–1972: Nyumba ya Sanaa Gallery, Tanzania (1st);
- 1972: Ile-Ife Museum of Afro-American Life and Culture, Philadelphia;
- 1972: Delaware Art Museum, Delaware;
- 1972: Philadelphia Civic Center Museum, Philadelphia;
- 1973: The Gallery at Centerville, Wilmington;
- 1974: Nyumba ya Sanaa Gallery, Tanzania (2nd);
- 1974: Cinque Gallery, New York (1st);
- 1975: Walnut Street Theatre, Philadelphia;
- 1975: Philadelphia Museum of Art, Philadelphia;
- 1976: Cinque Gallery, New York (2nd).

== Death ==
Howell died of diabetes on July 25, 1975 at the age of 32 in New York City. Divorced, he was the father of two children. That December, he received a posthumous award from Benin Enterprises during its Fourth Annual International Awards Presentation.
