= Otto Neals =

American painter and sculptor (born 1931)

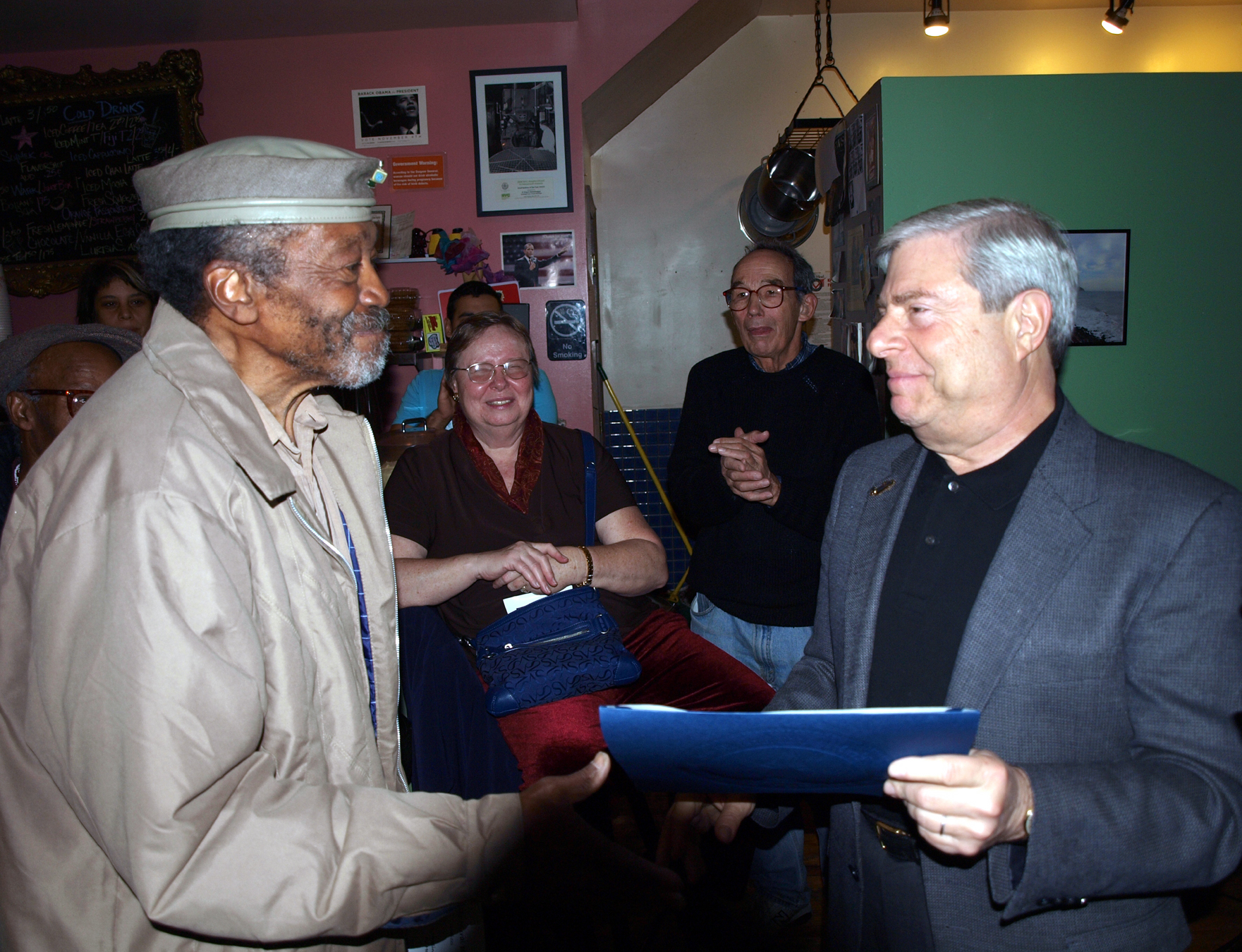
- Otto Neals with Marty Markowitz in 2009
- Born: December 11, 1931 (age 94); South Carolina, U.S.
- Occupations: painter and sculptor

Otto Neals (born December 11, 1931) is an American painter and sculptor. Throughout his career, Neals worked as an illustrator at the Brooklyn Post Office while pursuing independent art projects in his spare time. He currently resides in Crown Heights, Brooklyn.

== Early life and education ==
Born in South Carolina, Neals moved to New York at the age of four and displayed a passion for painting from a young age. Neals studied commercial art at George Westinghouse Vocational High School, and briefly attended the Brooklyn Museum Art School. Neals studied under notable artists such as Isaac Soyer, Krishna Reddy, Mohammed Khalil, Roberto DeLomanica, and Vivian Schuyler Key.

== Career ==
Neals has been a member of the Weusi Artist Collective since the 1960s.

Neals has been commissioned to execute several public works, including ten bronze plaques for the Harlem Walk of Fame, a 20-foot mural in Kings County Hospital, a bronze of Percy Sutton at the City University of New York, and a bronze monument inspired by the children's book Peter's Chair as centerpiece of an Imagination Playground in Prospect Park. His work is exhibited in the Smithsonian Institution, Howard University, and the Columbia Museum of Art. He features in the private collections of John Lewis, Harry Belafonte, and Oprah Winfrey, and was the subject of an exhibition in the gallery inside the Soldiers' and Sailors' Arch at Grand Army Plaza.

In June 2015, the Bedford Stuyvesant Restoration Corporation held a 50-year retrospective of his sculptures.

Neals is a founding artist of the Fulton Art Fair, the oldest Black visual arts event in Bedford-Stuyvesant, Brooklyn.

Neals has been the recipient of the New York City Art Commission's Award for Excellence in Design.
