= Gylbert Coker =

Gylbert Coker (Gylbert Garvin Coker; b. 1944) is an African-American art historian, artist, and curator who has worked to establish Black artists and art in the canon of American art.

Coker was an early member of Where We At, a group of Black women artists established in 1971 who created the first exhibition of Black women's art.

After earning a BFA at the Pratt Institute, Coker completed masters degrees from New York University and Hunter College and PhD from Florida State University. In 1977, Coker earned a fellowship at the Metropolitan Museum of Art; she later worked at the Guggenheim, the Museum of Modern Art, and the Zora Neale Hurston Museum. She was one of the first African-American scholars to write regularly for Art in America and Arts.

Coker's reviews of exhibitions by African-American artists, which have included Bob Thompson, Ed Love, and Bill Traylor, her essays about African-American art, and public talks (including Henry Ossawa Tanner) brought these artists into the canon of American art history. Her 1978 exhibition on Bob Thompson was the first retrospective on the artist.

She wrote about her theories of history in 1987:

What does writing about Afro-Americans mean to me? For me, the most valuable aspect of my writing has to do with the kind of scholar that I am. I am a revisionist. I rewrite the way in which we have come to perceive American culture, art and aesthetics. ... Every time I research an artist and identify his or her relationship to other artists, the participation and development of their style of perpetuation of a form, I am able to provide a more accurate presentation towards the making of the American aesthetic ... There is nothing sacred in history and certainly not in the making of American history. American history is still in the process of becoming.

== Selected works ==
- Critical essays published in
  - Hale Woodruff: 50 Years of His Art (1979)
  - The Harmon and Harriet Kelley Collection of African American Art (San Antonio: San Antonio Museum of Art, 1994)
  - Harry A. Ploski, ed. The Negro Almanac: A Reference Work on the Afro-American (New York: A Wiley-Interscience Publication, 1983). Coker also listed as an art consultant.
- Authored by Coker
  - Naptime (1978).
  - The world of Bob Thompson: [exhibition] November 5, 1978-January 7, 1979, The Studio Museum in Harlem (1978).
  - Emma Amos: Paper and Linen (1981).
  - Vivian Browne: Paintings and Pastels (1983).
  - Norman W. Lewis, 1909-1979: The second transition, 1947-1951: Abstractions (1994).
  - African American Art (1994).
  - Dona Honoria Cummings Clarke: One of the Wealthiest Women in 18th Century St. Augustine 1746-1804 (2012).
  - Nearest and Dearest: The Descendants of Thomas and Honoria Clarke Book 2 (2014).
