= Emmett Wigglesworth =

Visual artist

Emmett Wigglesworth is a muralist, painter, sculptor, fabric designer, poet and civil rights activist from Philadelphia, Pennsylvania. He has resided in New York since 1958. Wigglesworth is known for his abstract and colorful murals that he says are inspired by his own cultural heritage and life experience.

== Early life ==
Wigglesworth attended the College of Art and Design in Philadelphia. He later enlisted in military service, until he was honorably discharged from the U.S. Marine Corps in 1957.

== Career ==
Wigglesworth has designed and illustrated for several publishing companies, including McGraw-Hill, Harper & Roe, Macmillan Press and American Books. He also illustrated for Sesame Street Magazine. Additionally, Wigglesworth taught art at the New Muse in Brooklyn, the J.O.I.N. Center, the Children's Art Carnival, and the Harlem Parents Association in Manhattan. He designed the covers for two volumes of the Journal of Black Poetry.

In 1968, he designed the interior and exterior of the Bedford Stuyvesant Theater in Brooklyn. He also designed costumes and stage sets for the Black Spectrum Theater in Queens, New York.

In February 2010, Wigglesworth organized an exhibition of over 40 murals with the intention to give the public greater access to works by black artists. The exhibition was held at a Chapel St. nonprofit.

His work has been exhibited in Ghana and throughout the United States, and his mural commissions include: private homes, P.S. 181 in Brooklyn, the New York State Council on the Arts, Metropolitan Transit Authority, Kings County Hospital, Abyssinian Development Corporation and the Brooklyn Children’s Center, and 11 murals for the Addiction Research and Treatment Corporation and Urban Resource Institute (ARTC-URI).

Wigglesworth is currently an Artist-in-Residency at the Jamaica Center for Arts & Learning (JCAL), as well as the member of the National Conference of Artists, the WeUsi Artists NYC, Association of Caribbean and American Artists, AAA Artists and Cross Sections, the Fulton Art Fair Artists, as well as the Artists in Transition.

== Civil Rights Activism ==
In 1959, Wigglesworth participated in the Civil Rights Movement. In the early 1960s, he taught art at the CORE Freedom School in Selma, Alabama, where he wrote and directed two plays for the CORE Freedom Theater in San Francisco.

== Organizations ==
Wigglesworth is a member of the National Conference of Artists, Weusi Artist, Collective in New York City, Association of Caribbean and American Artists, AAA Artists and Cross Sections, as well as the Fulton Art Fair Artists.
