= Carole Byard =

American artist (1941–2017)

- Born: Carole Marie Byard; July 22, 1941; Atlantic City, New Jersey, US
- Died: January 11, 2017 (aged 75)
- Education: Fleischer Art Memorial; New York Phoenix School of Design
- Occupations: Illustrator photographer
- Years active: 1971–2017

Carole Marie Byard (July 22, 1941 – January 11, 2017) was an American visual artist, illustrator, and photographer. She was an award-winning illustrator of children's books, and the recipient of a Caldecott Honor, as well as multiple Coretta Scott King Awards.

== Early life and education ==
Byard was born in Atlantic City, New Jersey, to parents William "Bunny" Byard and Viola London-Byard. She had one sibling, an older brother, Michael Byard, who among other jobs, was a passionate gardener.

In 1943, Byard's mother died when she was very young, and her large extended family became very important to her. Around that same time, her father was drafted in World War II. Byard was raised by her father and grandmother after her mother's death.

Byard's father's family came from a Southern African-American tradition, and her paternal grandmother lived with them. Her father took over the role as head of the family when Byard's grandfather died. Her mother's family was from the Caribbean, from Barbados and Grenada – her mother was born on an island called Balboa in Panama while her grandfather worked building the Panama Canal.

Byard attended New Jersey Avenue School, then Central Junior High and then graduated from Atlantic City High School. Byard credits high school teacher Priscilla Gerard as an early motivator who taught her about the seriousness of art. Byard got a four-year scholarship to an art school in Ohio, but couldn't afford to go due to the death of someone close to her and her father becoming ill with cancer.

Byard instead began working as a simulation pilot at the National Aviation Facilities Experimental Center near Atlantic City. She used this job to support herself while studying at Fleischer Art Memorial in Philadelphia from 1961 until 1963.

Her mother's youngest sister Millicent lived in New York City, so after working and helping her father, Byard was able to go and live with her. From 1964 to 1968, Byard attended New York Phoenix School of Design at 33rd and Lexington, where she majored in illustration, and where she would later go on to teach. Byard also studied lithography with H. Morimoto and Robert Blackburn.

== Career ==
Byard said that as she was growing up she was passionate about reading, and loved books, but always felt that there were no books or images of people that looked like her, her family, and extended family, and how they lived as people.

During college, there were very few Black students. In an effort to connect with other Black artists, Byard went to the 1971 Where We At exhibition in the village called Where We At: Black Women Artists: 1971, and was able to connect with other Black women artists like Faith Ringgold. She became a part of the group.

In 1969 or 1970, Byard moved from Harlem into the Westbeth Artists Community two years after graduating from college. At Westbeth her neighbors included Freddie Waits and his son Nasheet Waits. At Westbeth, there was a Black Artists Guild that Byard said was formative. The Black Artists Guild that was initially a theater group founded in 1970. Byard went to see a production of Slave Ship, a play written by Amiri Baraka produced at Brooklyn Academy of Music. The play involved audience participation and singing. She was inspired by a character in the play and did a large painting based on the play. It turned out that many cast members also lived in Westbeth, and were part of this organization, based on Malcolm X's material left from Organization of Afro-American Unity, using the seven principles. Byard joined the group and participated in writing and making art.

Byard defined herself as a community artist, and this particular focus may have led to her lack of wider recognition and commercial success.

=== Illustration ===
After finishing art school, Byard found work as a magazine illustration artist before shifting her focus to children's books. Her interest in performing arts led to one of her first book projects, a biography of ballet dancer Arthur Mitchell, who founded the Dance Theater of Harlem.

In 1972, she received a Ford Foundation grant that funded three months of travel in Africa. She visited Senegal, Ghana, Ethiopia, Nigeria, and Egypt. In Ibadan, Nigeria, she painted a mural at the House of Light Temple. Byard returned to Nigeria as a delegate to the second Black and African Festival of Art and Culture (FESTAC) in Lagos in 1977. Her travel experiences informed the charcoal illustrations for her next children's book, Three African Tales by Adjai Robinson.

Byard went on to illustrate more than 16 children's books over the course of her career. Her work often focused on the African-American experience and on stories of African heritage. She was concerned with increasing the representation of people of color in American children's books, and her illustrations reflect that interest in centering Black stories. In The Black Snowman (1991), Byard used pastels to illustrate a fantastical story in which a boy brings a black snowman to life using city snow and a magical kente cloth. She was a contributing artist for the children's anthology Jump Back, Honey: The Poems of Paul Laurence Dunbar (1999), which also featured artwork by Jerry Pinkney and Faith Ringgold.

Working Cotton told a story, based on Williams's own childhood experiences, about a family of African-American migrant workers in the San Joaquin Valley in California. As part of her research for Working Cotton, Byard's brother helped her learn about cotton.

=== Fine art ===
Byard had a lifelong fine-art practice in painting, sculpture, installation and mixed-media art. She was part of the Black Arts Movement, a founding member of the Black Artists Guild and an early member of Where We At: Black Women Artists Inc. (WWA), a collective that grew out of a groundbreaking 1971 show called "Where We At: Black Women Artists, 1971."

Her earth art installations had reference points in vernacular front-yard decorations and traditional African-American burial sites. One example of such outdoor installations is Praisesong for Charles (1988), which was originally shown in Baltimore. In 1990, her work was exhibited in a group show called Chaney, Goodwin and Schwerner, the Mississippi Three: The Struggle Continues at the SoHo 20 Gallery in New York City. In 1992 she collaborated with Clarissa Sligh on an environmental, mixed-media "portrait" of Malcolm X for the Walker Art Center in Minneapolis.

Byard was a participant in the 1998 Smithsonian exhibit Resonant Forms: Contemporary African American Women Sculptors, curated by Deborah Willis. The piece she showed, titled "Imani, the Seventh Day" (1993), was an installation featuring a chair with a ladderlike back and gourds (which she had grown herself) hanging off it, standing in a tray filled with black eyed peas and pennies. On the chair's seat were corn kernels and red and green candles.

Over the course of her career, Byard also taught art at the Studio Museum in Harlem, Metropolitan Museum of Art, New York Foundation for the Arts, Baltimore School for the Arts, Maryland Institute College of Art, and Parsons School of Design.

==== Rent Series ====
The New York Public Library exhibited a collection of Byard's art known as the Rent Series in 2015. The artworks in the series, which she began painting in the 1980s, were inspired by boxes of rent receipts she found in her father's home after his death. Byard used the series to express the personal aspects of this discovery – the reality of her father's struggle to provide a home for his family – while weaving in larger themes related to African-American history and housing segregation. The paintings were loaned for the exhibition from the collection of her friend Alexis De Veaux.

== Other work ==
During the 1970s, Byard also designed album covers for Strata-East Records, a New York City jazz label. Her drawings and collages were featured on album jackets for Stanley Cowell, Charles Sullivan, Sonny Fortune, Milton Marsh, The Piano Choir, and the Heath Brothers.

== Honors and awards ==
- 1972: Ford Foundation travel grant for three months of travel in Africa
- 1977: Black and African Festival of Art and Culture (FESTAC), Delegate (Lagos)
- 1978: Coretta Scott King Illustrator Award for Africa Dream
- 1980: Coretta Scott King Illustrator Award for Cornrows
- 1981: Coretta Scott King Illustrator Honor for Grandma's Joy
- 1986: National Endowment for the Arts, Fellowship for drawing
- 1993: Coretta Scott King Illustrator Honor for Working Cotton
- 1993: Caldecott Honor for Working Cotton
- 1994: National Endowment for the Arts, Fellowship for sculpture

== Discography ==
- 1974: Genesis by Charles Sullivan (Strata-East) – Layout & Design
- 1974: Long Before Our Mothers Cried by Sonny Fortune (Strata-East) – Cover Artist/Designer
- 1974: Musa – Ancestral Streams by Stanley Cowell (Strata-East) – Artist-Designer
- 1975: Monism by Milton Marsh (Strata-East) – Graphics
- 1975: The Piano Choir by Handscapes 2 (Strata-East) – Art direction/design
- 1976: Regeneration by Stanley Cowell (Strata-East) – Cover art & design
- 1976: Marchin' On! by The Heath Brothers (Strata-East) – Graphic artist
- 2003: Continuum by Sonny Fortune (Sound Reason) – Cover art

== Selected exhibitions ==
=== Selected group exhibitions ===
- 1975: Sojourn: An Exhibition of Paintings and Sculpture, Carole Byard and Valerie Maynard, Gallery 1199 (New York, NY) – March 18 – June 5, 1975
- 1978: Migrations: A National Exhibition of African-American Printmakers, Gallery of Art, College of Fine Arts, Howard University (Washington, D.C.) – Aug. 28 – September 23, 1978
- 1980: The Child: Paintings, Drawings, Sculpture, Gallery 62 (New York, NY)
- 1989: War, Peace and Victory: A Sculpture Exhibition in Memorial Arch, Grand Army Plaza, Prospect Park, Brooklyn, Prospect Park Alliance (New York, NY) – April 29 – June 17, 1989
- 1998: Resonant Forms: Contemporary African American Women Sculptors, Smithsonian Institution (Washington, D.C.)
- 1990: Dia De Los Muertos III: Homelessness, The Alternative Museum (New York, NY) – November 2–December 15, 1990
- 1990–1992: Ancestors Known and Unknown: Box Work – Traveling exhibition held at Art in General, New York, February 1990; Islip Art Museum, March 1991; Barnes-Blackman Gallery Community Artists' Collective and The Firehouse Gallery, Houston, April 1991; Wooster College Museum, Sept. 1991; Kean College, October 1991; Women and their work, Austin, June 1992
- 1992–1993: Malcolm X: Man, Ideal, Icon, Walker Art Center (Minneapolis, MN) – December 1992–April 1993
- 1993: Through Sisters' Eyes: Children's Books Illustrated by African-American Women Artists, National Museum of Women in the Arts, Newark Museum (Newark, NJ)
- 2017: We Wanted a Revolution: Black Radical Women, 1965–85, Brooklyn Museum (Brooklyn, NY)

=== Selected solo exhibitions ===
- 1993: Sculpture Installation by Carole Byard, Dana Gallery at the Phillips Museum of Art at Franklin & Marshall College (Lancaster, PA) – January 21–February 14, 1993
- 2015: Rent Series, New York Public Library (New York, NY)

== Selected works and publications ==
- King, Helen Hayes; Byard, Carole M. (pictures by) (1971). Willy. Garden City, NY: Doubleday. OCLC 155531.
- Phumla; Byard, Carole M. (illustrated by) (1972). Nomi and the Magic Fish: A Story from Africa. Garden City, NY: Doubleday. OCLC 647513.
- Callahan, Dorothy M.; Byard, Carole M. (illustrated by) (1972). Under Christopher's Hat. New York: Scribner. ISBN 978-0-684-12685-2. OCLC 304028.
- Po, Lee (retold by); Byard, Carole (illustrated by) (1974). The Sycamore Tree and Other African Tales. Garden City, NY: Doubleday. ISBN 978-0-385-00561-6. OCLC 803708.
- Tobias, Tobi; Byard, Carole (illustrated by) (1975). Arthur Mitchell. New York: Crowell. ISBN 978-0-690-00661-2. OCLC 1008063.
- Greenfield, Eloise; Byard, Carole (illustrated by) (1992). Africa Dream. New York: HarperTrophy. ISBN 978-0-064-43277-1. OCLC 317843522.
- Little, Lessie Jones; Greenfield, Eloise; Byard, Carole (illustrated by) (1978). I Can Do It by Myself. New York: Crowell. ISBN 978-0-690-01369-6. OCLC 3543614.
- Robinson, Adjai; Byard, Carole (illustrated by) (1979). Three African Tales. New York, NY: Putnam. ISBN 978-0-399-20656-6. OCLC 4494859.
- Yarbrough, Camille; Byard, Carole (illustrated by) (1979). Cornrows. New York: Coward, McCann & Geoghegan. ISBN 978-0-698-20462-1. OCLC 4504360.
- Hill, Robert Bernard (foreword by); Byard, Carole M.; Cox, Virginia; Feelings, Tom; Wilson, George (1980). The Child: Paintings, Drawings, Sculpture. New York, NY: Gallery 62, National Urban League, Inc. OCLC 79317568. – Catalog of an exhibition held at Gallery 62 from December 3, 1979, to January 11, 1980
- Greenfield, Eloise; Byard, Carole (illustrated by) (1980). Grandmama's Joy. New York, NY: Philomel. ISBN 978-0-399-21064-8. OCLC 9895338.
- Walter, Mildred Pitts; Byard, Carole (illustrated by) (1989). Have a Happy... New York, NY: Lothrop, Lee & Shepard Books. ISBN 978-0-380-71314-1. OCLC 29060061.
- Lippard, Lucy; Byard, Carole M.; Sligh, Clarissa T.; Min, Yong Soon (1991). "Praising Her Name". Ancestors Known and Unknown: Box Work. New York, NY: Coast to Coast National Women Artists of Color. OCLC 24352506. – Traveling exhibition from February 1990 to June 1992
- Mendez, Phil; Byard, Carole (illustrated by) (1991). The Black Snowman. New York: Scholastic. ISBN 978-0-590-44873-4. OCLC 461374858.
- Williams, Sherley Anne (written by); Byard, Carole (illustrated by) (1992). Working Cotton (1st ed.). San Diego, CA: Harcourt Brace Jovanovich. ISBN 978-0-152-99624-6. OCLC 23970022.
- Bryan, Ashley (selected and with an introduction by); Pinkney, Andrea Davis (selected and with an introduction by); Bryan, Ashley (illustrations by); Byard, Carole (illustrations by); Spivey-Gilchrist, Jan (illustrations by); Pinkney, Brian (illustrations by); Pinkney, Jerry (illustrations by); Ringgold, Faith (illustrations by) (1999). Jump Back, Honey: The Poems of Paul Laurence Dunbar. New York: Jump at the Sun/Hyperion Books for Children. ISBN 978-0-786-82406-9. OCLC 40460104.
- Johnston, Tony; Byard, Carole (illustrated by) (2001). Angel City. New York, NY: Philomel Books. ISBN 978-0-399-23405-7. OCLC 44588095.
- Jackson, Gale P.; Byard, Carole (artwork by) (2006). Suite for Mozambique. New York, NY: Ikon. ISBN 978-0-945-36810-6. OCLC 68813553.
