= Vivian Schuyler Key =

American artist (1905–1990)

Vivian Schuyler–Key
- Born: Vivian Schuyler; November 3, 1905; Hempstead, New York, United States
- Died: 1990 (aged 84–85)
- Other name: Vivian Key
- Education: Pratt Institute
- Occupations: Painter, sculptor, printmaker, designer, illustrator
- Movement: Harlem Renaissance

Vivian Schuyler-Key (née Vivian Schuyler; November 3, 1905 – 1990), was an American painter, sculptor, printmaker, designer, and illustrator. She began her career in the 1920s, working within the Harlem Renaissance. Her chosen medium was oil painting, particularly still life paintings of flowers, landscapes, and human subjects. Schuyler-Keys can be stylistically identified with figurative realism. She focused mainly on figurative realism. Schuyler-Key was the first Black woman to graduate from the Pratt Institute.

== Early life and education ==
Vivian Schuyler was born on November 3, 1905, to Black parents Henry Foster Schuyler, and Jessie Valentine Schuyler. Her father worked as a coachmen, and her mother worked as a domestic worker. Schuyler was born in Hempstead, New York, and attended Hempstead High School where she was the art editor for her high school's yearbook. She graduated with her diploma in 1923 and proceeded to win a New York State scholarship that same year.

With the support of her New York State scholarship, Schuyler-Key attended Pratt Institute School of Fine Arts (now Pratt Institute) from 1923 to 1926. In 1947, Schuyler-Key graduated from the Pratt Institute, making her the first Black woman to do so. She was the first Black woman to graduate from Pratt Institute.

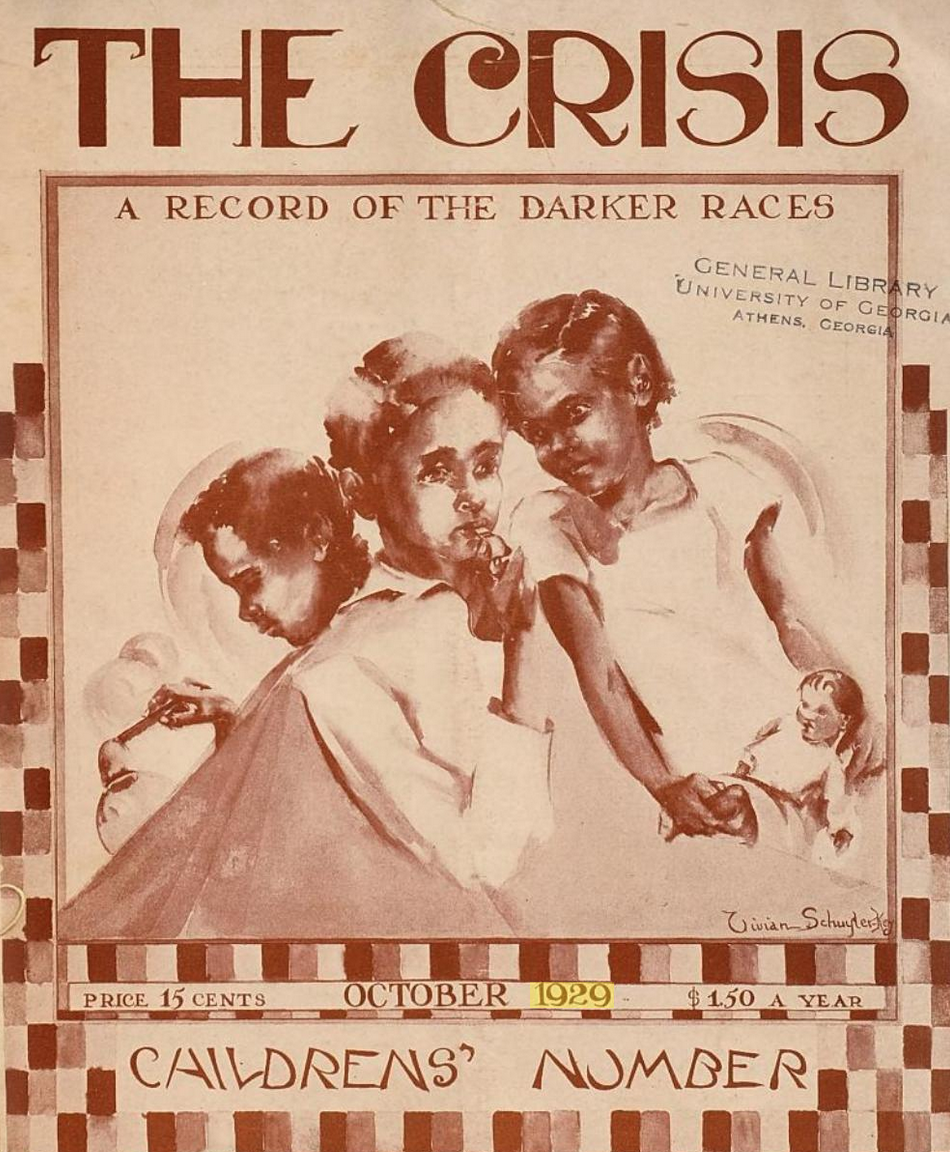
A painting by Vivian Schuyler Key on the October 1929 cover of The Crisis

== Career ==
After graduation Schuyler Key exhibited her artwork, noted group exhibitions include at Spelman College (1930) in Atlanta, Georgia; Howard University art gallery (1932) in Washington, D.C.; Skylight Gallery (1990) in Brooklyn; Soapstone Gallery (1993) in Decatur, Georgia; and Hammonds House Museum (2012) in Atlanta, Georgia. She also taught stone carving to artist Otto Neals; worked as a director of Verina Morton Jones and Mary White Ovington's Lincoln Settlement House at 105 Fleet Place in Brooklyn; and held the role of director at Glen Cove Settlement House in Long Island.

== The Crisis ==
In 1927, at the age of 22, Schuyler-Key won the Amy E. Spingarn Krigiva Award for her cover design for the NAACP magazine, The Crisis. The cover she designed was the November 1927 issue which featured articles from notable figures including W.E.B. Dubois, G.W. Buckner, Joseph Maree Andrew, and Effie Lee Newsome. Her cover depicts a singing female figure in a white dress who is surrounded by other figures. The quotation "Lift Every Voice and Sing" is also featured on this issue's cover.

== Collaboration with W.E.B. Dubois ==
In 1927, Schuyler-Key created a portrait of W. E. B. Du Bois for the annual publication of The Crisis. This collaboration inspired a later letter to Du Bois on November 20, 1961, congratulating him on his multitude of publications and his contributions to the Civil rights movement, stating that Du Bois was not receiving the "proper recognition of his achievements." In this letter, Schuyler-Key reminisced on her time with Du Bois and reflected on the praise she received for her portrait of him.
