= 2006 Greenwich Village assault case =

2006 American legal case

On August 18, 2006, Dwayne Buckle, an African American independent filmmaker, and a group of seven young black lesbian friends from Newark, New Jersey, got into a physical conflict outside of the IFC Center movie theater in Greenwich Village, in Manhattan, New York City. During the altercation, Buckle was cut; he required five days of hospitalization. The women claimed that they were acting in self-defense, while Buckle claims the women initiated the attack motivated to commit "a hate crime against a straight man".

The case sparked sensational media attention. Four members of the group of seven women were subsequently tried and convicted. Three of the convictions were overturned on appeal; of those three, two were ordered new trials, and both were convicted again. The one whose case was dismissed had spent two years in prison.

== Incident ==
Buckle says he was trying to sell some of his DVDs on the street in Manhattan's Greenwich Village, and he approached one of the women in the group, whom he "admired". Buckle said she smiled back, but another woman in the group responded by mocking his jeans and sneakers as "cheap". Buckle says he responded to the insult in kind and an argument ensued, whereupon one woman slapped him and another spat on him. Buckle says he spat back, then he was attacked by the group, clawed and ultimately severely cut on the abdomen.

Patreese Johnson testified that Buckle initiated the altercation by pointing to her crotch and demanding, "Let me get some of that!" as her group walked past him. She claimed she replied, "No thank you, I'm not interested in that", whereupon Buckle began following them, making more crude comments and gestures. After the women proclaimed themselves lesbians, Buckle allegedly threw a cigarette at them and became even more insulting, calling the group "fucking dykes", and yelled, "I'll fuck you straight, sweetheart". The group stopped and confronted him, and more harsh words were exchanged. Buckle then began shoving the women, ultimately tackling and choking Renata Hill. Johnson, afraid for Hill's life, cut Buckle using a steak knife.

Two or three male bystanders, whose identities were never ascertained, intervened in the fight. The women claimed they were "Good Samaritans" acting of their own volition to assist them against their attacker. Buckle claimed the women recruited the men to attack him. One defense attorney advanced the women's testimony that one of the intervenors, not Johnson, was the individual who actually cut Buckle.

== Trial ==
Buckle, a New York resident, testified that he could not remember which of the women he thought was pretty. He testified that before the attack he told one woman she looked like an elephant, and another that she looked like a man. He also testified that his only physical response to the attack was to put his hands in front of his face. The defense presented surveillance footage of Buckle on top of a woman with his hands on her throat. At trial, a police officer who recovered Johnson's knife at the scene testified that he saw no blood on it. No forensic testing was done on the knife. Law enforcement never attempted to find the men who intervened in the melee. The defense claimed the video footage showed Buckle initiating the altercation.

The prosecutor's case was based on video that showed Johnson calmly stepping out of the fray, removing her knife from her bag, then stepping back into the group attack. Johnson alone was charged with attempted murder.

The trial itself was lengthy, lasting nearly a year. The all-white jury of 10 women and two men deliberated for only five hours, finding all four women, New Jersey residents, guilty of second-degree gang assault. Johnson was found not guilty of attempted murder. New York Supreme Court Justice Edward McLaughlin pronounced sentences ranging from 3½ to 11 years. The judge cited as "damning" evidence video surveillance depicting Venice Brown chasing Buckle down. At the conclusion, Buckle told the New York Daily News: "I'm stabbed and I have a scar that will be with me for the rest of my life...They have their jail sentences, but they'll be out soon. This is what I get for being a nice guy."

Three of the seven women pleaded guilty to attempted assault, and were sentenced to six months. The other four went to trial and were convicted. Two of these women's convictions were subsequently overturned: Terrain Dandridge's appeal succeeded on the basis that there was insufficient evidence to support her conviction; Renata Hill's conviction was reversed on the basis that the trial judge gave the jury faulty instructions. As of June 2008, Patreese Johnson and Venice Brown's convictions were still pending appeal. As of sometime after June 2008, the courts have ruled and Venice Brown can have a new trial like Renata Hill (both Hill and Brown were subsequently convicted) and Johnson's conviction was upheld for her attempting murder. As of 2018, they should no longer be serving time in prison for this incident.

== Media coverage ==
Much of the media coverage was sensational, referring to the incident as the "attack of the killer lesbians", and to the group as a "seething sapphic septet". The case was also cited in a Village Voice article about rap culture and young black lesbians.

The O'Reilly Factor ran a segment entitled "Violent Lesbian Gangs a Growing Problem". The story described the incident from a point of view sympathetic to Buckle, and described a "national underground network... that's actually recruiting kids as young as 10 years old" and engaging in homosexual recruitment. The story described these gangs as groups that "just want to hurt people".

The Southern Poverty Law Center criticized O'Reilly's story as inaccurate, and criticized the segment's commentator, Rod Wheeler, as unqualified. The SPLC's Hatewatch website sarcastically awarded O'Reilly their "Most Gullible Broadcaster Award".

The Gay City News criticized the sensationalistic coverage, pointing to elements the mainstream press ignored, such as allegations that Buckle tore a chunk of hair from one woman's scalp.

A New York-based LGBT youth advocacy group, FIERCE, claimed the women's prosecution was motivated by attempts to "gentrify" the West Village area, noting the judge's comments about "how New York welcomes tourists". FIERCE also complained that "every possible racist, anti-woman, anti-LGBT and anti-youth tactic" was used by the prosecution against the women.

Out In The Night, a documentary film by blair dorosh-walther, was released in June 2014. The documentary follows the four women who did not plead guilty, telling the story for the first time from their points of view. AlterNet named Out in the Night one of the top 12 best and most powerful documentaries of 2014, saying that that film "might be considered the ethical journalism the media itself failed to produce around the 2006 case of the 'New Jersey Four.'" The film highlighted the injustices done to the four defendants. One major flaw during the trial was that Buckle's injuries were perceived to be more severe than they actually were. At the hospital, Buckle received a surgery to fix his hernia. Jurors were tricked into believing the large scar from the surgery was actually the stab wound he received during the altercation.

== See also ==
- Sakia Gunn
- Crime in New York City
