= William Howells =

William Howells may refer to:

- William Howells (Mormon) (1816–1851), Welsh Mormon missionary
- William Dean Howells (1837–1920), author and critic
- William W. Howells (1908–2005), anthropologist
- William Howels or Howells, (1778–1832), Welsh priest of the Church of England

== See also ==
- William Howell (disambiguation), a similar name
