= Weusi Artist Collective =

Weusi Artist Collective is an organization of African-American artists, established in 1965, based in the Harlem section of New York City. Inspired by the Black Arts Movement, the members of the Weusi Artist Collective create art invoking African themes and symbols. The organization was a major driving force behind the development, production and dissemination of black art in the United States in the 1960s and 1970s.

== Formation of Weusi Artist Collective ==
The 1960s ushered in a period during which Black artists rejected artistic traditions and created art exploring the African American cultural and historical experience. In embracing the self-determination concept of the 1960s, Black artists were charged with charting their ideological direction and aesthetic principles. In that spirit, a coalition of more than 50 artists, called Twentieth Century Creators, was formed under the leadership of James Sneed and Malikah Rahman. The group staged a sidewalk exhibition in Harlem in the summer of 1964, aiming to bring Black art directly to the Black people. However, the organization ultimately disbanded as a result of ideological differences.

In 1965, several ex-members of Twentieth Century Creators regrouped to form an artists collective, naming it the Weusi Artist Collective (in Swahili, weusi means "blackness."). Among the founding members were Ben Jones, Otto Neals, Taiwo DuVall, Ademola Olugebefola, Okoe Pyatt, Emmett Wigglesworth, Gaylord Hassan, Abdullah Aziz, Dindga McCannon, and Kay Brown.

== Subsequent activities ==
The Weusi Artist Collective would become the pacesetter for much of the cultural movement in Harlem for the rest of the 1960s and into the 1970s. In 1967, five member artists, Aziz, G. Falcon Beazer, Taiwo DuVall, Rudy Irvin, and Neals, founded Nyumba Ya Sanaa Gallery (“House of Art” in Swahili). The gallery was housed in a brownstone located at 158 West 132nd Street near 7th Avenue.

In 1968, the Nyumba Ya Sanaa Gallery became a full cooperative involving the entire Weusi membership and was renamed the Weusi Nyumba Ya Sanaa Gallery. That year, the Weusi Artist Collective grew to consist of 15 members, including Ghanaian Nii Ahene Mettle Nunoo who represented the international expansion of Weusi. The Weusi organization was at the forefront of leadership of the Black Arts Movement as the movement reached its peak at the end of the 1960s.

In the early 1970s, the Weusi Nyumba Ya Sanaa Gallery was expanded and renamed the Weusi Nyumba Ya Sanaa Academy of Fine Arts and Studies. This development elevated the facility to a fully comprehensive educational institution servicing the community. Tours and lectures were available, as well as art workshops. Under the directorships of Aziz and DuVall, a special Weusi printmaking workshop for community artists was started. During summer, the academy produced and sponsored the famous annual Harlem Outdoor Art Festival at St. Nicholas Park, where at least ten blocks of sidewalk fencing was licensed and reserved from the New York Parks Department for it. This special event drew artists and spectators countrywide. Eventually, dance concerts, live jazz shows, and professional drumming concerts became integral to the celebration. The exhibition continued for fourteen years, demonstrating the longevity of community involvement and support; it paved the way for “Harlem Week,” a major celebration of the Black community held to this day.

== Members ==
- Abdul Rahman
- Abdullah Aziz
- Che Baraka
- G. Falcon Beazer
- Kay Brown
- Ken Wright
- Perry Cannon
- Stanwyck Cromwell
- Robert Daniels (Artist)
- Taiwo DuVall
- Gaylord Hassan
- Bill Howell
- Rod Ivey
- MLJ Johnson
- Nii Ahene La Mettle-Nunoo
- Dindga McCannon
- Karl A. McIntosh
- Otto Neals
- Ademola Olugebefola
- Okoe Pyatt
- Ed Sherman
- Emmett Wigglesworth

== Exhibitions ==
- Weusi 1990: Recent & Vintage Works, held January 21 to February 16, 1990, at the Bedford-Stuyvesant Center for Art & Culture, Brooklyn, New York
- Resurrection III, held at the African American Museum (New York), February 2008
- Weusi.com, curated by MLJ Johnson, held at the Jamaica Center for Arts & Learning, February 5-March 24, 2016
- Weusi Revisited, 2010, held at the Dwyer Cultural Center, Harlem, New York City, February 2010
- Imposing Blackness: Weusi Artist Collective, 1965-1975 Curated by Dr. Myrah Brown Green at the Robert Blackburn Printmaking Workshop July 24 - September 18, 2022
