= Ademola Olugebefola =

American visual artist (born 1941)

- Born: Bedwick Lyola Thomas; October 2, 1941 (age 84); Charlotte Amalie, St. Thomas, U.S. Virgin Islands
- Education: Fashion Institute of Technology (AA)
- Occupations: Visual artist, designer, educator, musician, businessperson
- Movement: Black Arts Movement
- Spouse: Pat Davis (m. ?–2017; her death)
- Children: 7

Ademola Olugebefola (né Bedwick Lyola Thomas; born October 2, 1941) is an American multidisciplinary visual artist, designer, educator, musician, and businessperson from Saint Thomas, U.S. Virgin Islands. He is considered a founder within the Black Arts Movement of the 1960s and 1970s. Olugebefola art practice includes work in painting, murals, printmaking, illustration, drawing, theatre scenic design, and sculpture. He lives in Harlem, New York City, where he moved in 1966.

== Early life and education ==
Ademola Olugebefola was born as Bedwick Lyola Thomas on October 2, 1941, in Charlotte Amalie, St. Thomas, U.S. Virgin Islands. At a young age, he moved with his family to New York City, where he was raised.

He graduated with an A.A. degree from the Fashion Institute of Technology.

== Career ==
=== Fine arts ===
Olugebefola joined the Twentieth-Century Creators group in 1964; and was a founder of Weusi Artist Collective in 1965 and subsequently the Weusi Gallery in New York City. These three organizations supported African-American artists, made work for a Black audience, and their work often featured pan-African aesthetics, themes and symbols. He later co-founded of the Dwyer Cultural Center in Harlem, New York City.

Olugebefola took part in the exhibitions Seeing Jazz: Artists and Writers on Jazz (1997) at the Smithsonian Institution, Washington, D.C.; Black Art-Ancestral Legacy: The African Impulse in African-American Art (1989–1990) at the Dallas Museum of Art in Dallas, Texas; When The Spirit Moves: African American Art Inspired by Dance (2000–2001) at the Spelman College Museum of Fine Art in Atlanta, and Anacostia Community Museum in Washington D.C.; and the 2025 exhibition Photography and the Black Arts Movement, 1955–1985 at the National Gallery of Art.

Olugebefola's work can be found in museum collections, including the Studio Museum in Harlem; and his papers are in the archives at Schomburg Center for Research in Black Culture.

=== Design and business ===
He has illustrated many books, magazines, and other publications, including Shirley E. Riley's poetry book, The Cool is Gone (1979).

In the 1970s with his brothers, he opened "Ori-Gem", a Caribbean apparel store and gallery in St. Thomas. In 1978, he opened "Tetrahedron", an arts brokerage. In 1980, with his wife Pat Davis, he opened Solar Associates an marketing, advertising, and graphic production firm.

== Exhibitions ==
- Black Art-Ancestral Legacy: The African Impulse in African-American Art (1989–1990), group exhibitions, Dallas Museum of Art, Dallas, Texas
- Seeing Jazz: Artists and Writers on Jazz (1997), group exhibition, Smithsonian Institution, Washington D.C.
- When The Spirit Moves: African American Art Inspired by Dance (2000–2001), group exhibition, Spelman College Museum of Fine Art in Atlanta, and Anacostia Community Museum in Washington D.C.

== See also ==
- AfriCOBRA, Black artist collective from Chicago
- Cinque Gallery in New York City
