= Dindga McCannon =

American artist (born 1947)

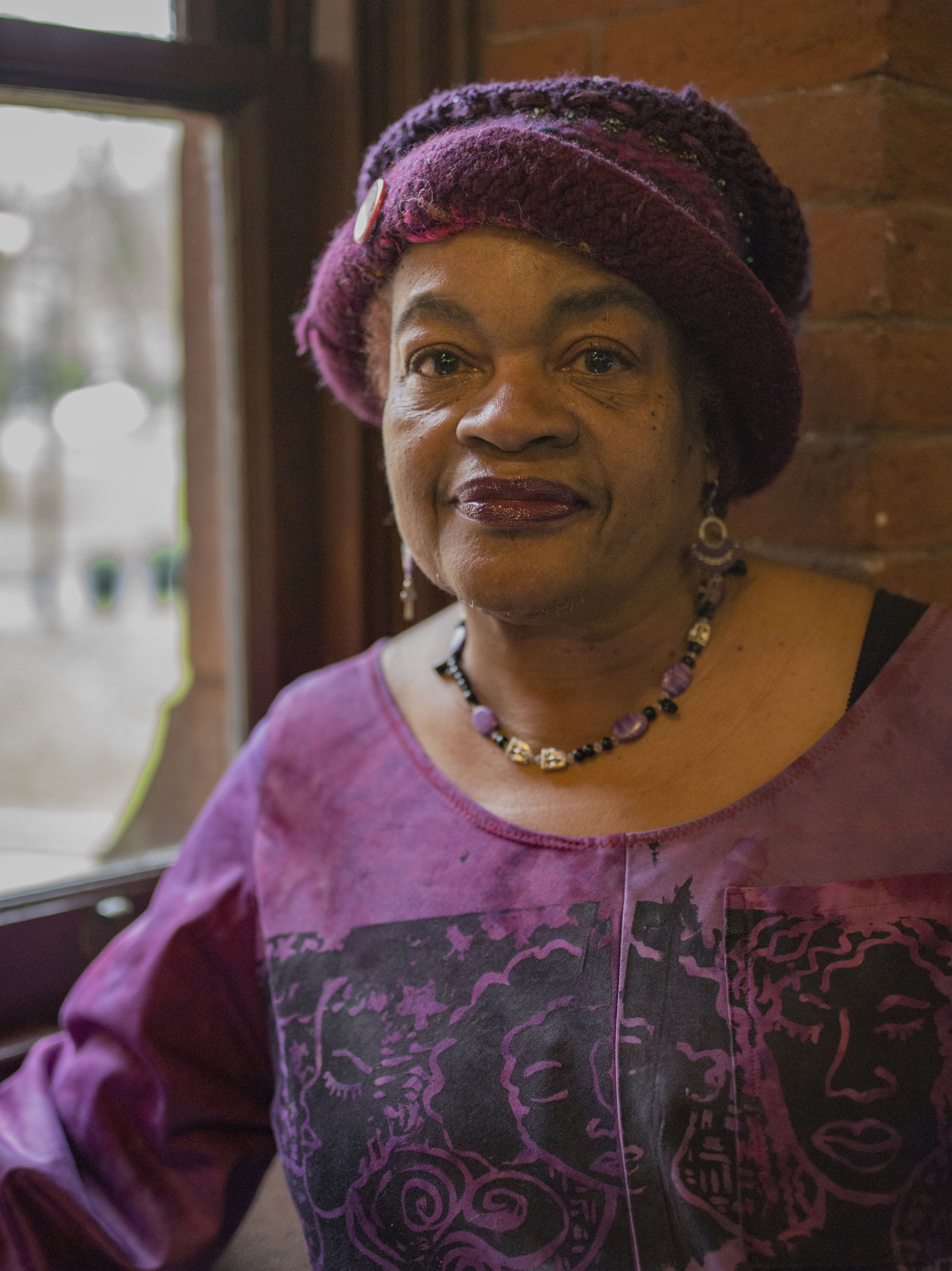
- Born: Dindga McCannon; July 31, 1947 (age 79)
- Known for: Art, murals, printmaking, teaching, illustration, fiber art, writing
- Website: dindgamccannon.world

External videos
- “Outspoken: Dindga McCannon, May 7, 2018
- The Artist's Voice: Dindga McCannon, Beverly Smith, and Barbara Smith, ICA/Boston, October 16, 2018

Dindga McCannon (born July 31, 1947) is an African-American artist born and raised in New York City. She has had a multifaceted career as a fiber artist, muralist, teacher, author, and illustrator. McCannon co‑founded Where We At, a collective of Black women artists, in 1971.

== Early life and education ==
Born in Roosevelt Island and raised in Harlem, McCannon was inspired to become an artist at the age of 10. She was an only child raised by her mother Lottie Kilgo Porter, grandmother Hattie Kilgo, and stepfather Albert Porter. After her grandmother died in 1960, McCannon and her family moved into The Bronx.

Showing a passion to become an artist from a young age, Dindga McCannon was accepted into the High School of Fashion Industries and High School of Art and Design. However, her mother did not allow her to attend either high school out of fear of her not having a stable career in the future. Around 1961, she attended the Fashion Institute for Technology or FIT for high school, in the first class of African American students allowed into fashion design, not just factory tech study. She ultimately left due to lack of support; after one poor midterm grade, she was tracked into all-sewing classes. McCannon then transferred to the High School of Commerce, where she graduated in 1964. She had no arts education there, although an English teacher encouraged her to illustrate her book reports. Shortly after she left the school, it was torn down to make room for the construction of the Lincoln Center.

After graduation, McCannon volunteered with the American Red Cross, where she worked at Harlem schools not far from where she grew up and was living. The director, James White, noticed her art talent and asked her to teach art as part of her volunteering, and told her about an art show in the projects on 129th Street. There, she met and joined the arts collective called The Twentieth Century Art Creators. There was eventually a split in this group, and she joined the branch that became the Weusi Artist Collective. She briefly attended City College for two years, but dropped out due to the fact that she began to learn more through the artist group she became a part of.

== Career ==
Dindga McCannon has been an artist for 55 years. She is self-taught and works intuitively. Calling herself a mixed-media multimedia artist, she works at "fusing my fine art 'training' with the traditional women's needlework taught to me by my mother, Lottie K. Porter, and grandmother Hattie Kilgo — sewing, beading, embroidery, and quilting into what is now known as ArtQuilts." In addition to her work as a quilter, author, and illustrator, Dindga considers herself a costume designer, muralist, and a print maker. Her work involves women's lives, portraits, and history.

In response to sexism and racism in the art world, artists in the 1960s and 1970s created collectives as a way to fight oppression. In the 1960s, McCannon was a member of Weusi Artist Collective. This is how McCannon became interested in the Black Arts Movement. The Weusi Collective was interested in creating art that evoked African themes and symbols, as well as highlighting contemporary black pride. This artist collective provided her with the basic foundational skills in order to create visual art. Not only was she a part of this artist collective, but in 1965 McCannon joined the Congress of Racial Equality and took part in their march in Washington in protest of the Vietnam War.

In 1971, concerned to represent her experience as a Black woman artist and single mother, she hosted the first meeting of the Where We At group of black women artists, a group started with Kay Brown and Faith Ringgold, in her apartment. It grew into a group of women who supported each other, taught workshops, and exhibited in one of the first group shows of professional black women artists in New York City.

McCannon's interest in black arts and women's work met in her creation of dashikis, which then led her to create wearables and quilts.

Her image is included in the iconic 1972 poster Some Living American Women Artists by Mary Beth Edelson.

In 2015, she was a presenter at the Art of Justice: Articulating an Ethos and Aesthetic of the Movement conference at New York University presented by the Caribbean Cultural Center African Diaspora Institute in Collaboration with the Department of Art and Public Policy, New York University; Institute of African American Affairs, New York University; and Institute for Research in African American Studies, Columbia University.

== Artworks ==
McCannon has a quilt (titled "Yekk's Song") in the permanent collection of the Schomburg Center for Research in Black Culture. In January 2020, McCannon's oil painting "The Last Farewell" was auctioned for $161,000 as part of Johnson Publishing Company's bankruptcy proceedings. This work was part of their private collection, which also included works by Henry Ossawa Tanner and Carrie Mae Weems.

Revolutionary Sister, a mixed-media work created in 1971, was created in response to a lack of revolutionary women warriors. The work depicts a powerful and colorful sister, created in part with items from the hardware store. McCannon speaks about this piece as a Statue of Liberty figure. It is in the permanent collection of the Brooklyn Museum.

Bessie's Song is a mixed-media piece created in 2003. It was made using appliqué and machine quilted cottons, gold lame, vintage beaded trim, embroidered patches, glass beads, and metallic threads.

== Books ==
McCannon has written and illustrated two books. Peaches, published by Lothrop, Lee & Shepard in 1974 and by Dell in 1977, tells the story of a young black girl growing up in Harlem, her life with her family, and her ambition to be an artist.

Wilhemina Jones, Future Star, published by Delacorte in 1980, has a similar theme, with a young black girl growing up in Harlem in the mid-1960s who dreams of pursuing an art career and leaving the oppressive atmosphere of her home.

McCannon has also illustrated books for others: Omar at X-mas by Edgar White (published by Lothrop, Lee & Shepard), and Speak to the Winds, African Proverbs, written by K. O. Opuku (Lothrop, Lee & Shepard, 1972).

In 2018, McCannon published an illustrated cookbook called Celebrations. The opening reception was held at Art For the Soul Gallery in Springfield, Massachusetts.

== Commissions ==
McCannon has also been commissioned to create various pieces of art.

- 1985: United Community, 50 ft by 6 stories, 25 Furman Ave, Brooklyn, NY, Dept of Cultural Affairs
- 2000: Amazing Life of Althea Gibson, 60 inches by 120 inches art story quilt, Disney Inc for ESPN Zone, 42nd Street and Brady, NYC
- 2001: Winning the Vote, Art Quilt on the Pioneers of Women's voting history America, Scholastic Magazine
- 2008: Zora Neale Hurston, B.O.S.S. (Barnard Organization of Soul Sisters), Columbia University, NY

== Notable works in public collections ==
- Mercedes (1971), Studio Museum in Harlem, New York
- Revolutionary Sister (1971), Brooklyn Museum, New York
- Empress Akweke (1975), Brooklyn Museum, New York
- West Indian Day Parade (1976), Brooklyn Museum, New York
- Woman #1 (1975-1977), National Gallery of Art, Washington, D.C.
- Badass Women Who Inspire Me to Soar (2006), National Gallery of Art, Washington, D.C.
- Charlie Parker and Some of the Amazing Musicians He Influenced (1983/2010), The Phillips Collection, Washington, D.C.
- A Week in the Life of a Black Woman Artist (2013), Brooklyn Museum, New York

== Awards ==
- 2023 – Anonymous Was A Woman (AWAW) - Individual Artist Grant
- 2005 – N. Y. F. A. Fellowship – Crafts
- 2007 – Urban Artists Initiative, Harlem Arts Alliance
- 2008 – Northern Manhattan Arts Alliance – Individual Artists Grant 2009 – Northern Manhattan Arts Alliance – Individual Artist Grant
