= William D. Howell =

American physician

William D. Howell (1797–1836) was an American surgeon who died as a defender of the Alamo in 1836.

Howell was a medical doctor who was born in Massachusetts in 1797, but lived in New York before traveling to Texas by way of New Orleans in 1835. He came to Texas as a member of Capt. Thomas H. Breece's company of New Orleans Greys. Howell participated in the Siege of Bexar and later served at the Alamo as a member of Capt. William Blazeby's infantry company. On March 6, 1836 Howell died in the Battle of the Alamo.

== See also ==
- List of Alamo defenders

== Sources ==
- Daughters of the American Revolution, The Alamo Heroes and Their Revolutionary Ancestors (San Antonio, 1976). Daughters of the Republic of Texas, Muster Rolls of the Texas Revolution (Austin, 1986). Bill Groneman, Alamo Defenders (Austin: Eakin, 1990).
