= Uri McMillan =

American academic

Uri McMillan is an American humanities academic whose research interests include performance studies, black cultural studies, aesthetics, contemporary art, popular culture and queer theory from a cultural history perspective. As of 2026, he is a Professor in the Department of English at the University of California, Los Angeles.

== Education ==
McMillan received his Ph.D. in African-American studies & American studies from Yale University in 2009.

== Books ==
Embodied Avatars: Genealogies of Black Feminist Art and Performance (NYU Press 2015), McMillan's first book, studies the exclusion of black female performers from the historiography of contemporary performance art. Through case studies focusing on Joice Heth, Ellen Craft, Adrian Piper, Howardena Pindell, Simone Leigh and Nicki Minaj, McMillan argues that there is a long history of black female performers who use the avatar to embrace their objecthood, modifying the image of bodies through artistic production. McMillan has also published articles and given public lectures about Janelle Monáe in a similar vein.

== Articles ==
- “Nicki-aesthetics: The camp performance of Nicki Minaj,” Women and Performance: a journal of feminist theory, Special Issue: All Hail the Queenz: A Queer Feminist Recalibration of Hip-Hop, Vol. 24, Issue 1, March 2014: 1–9.
- “Objecthood, Avatars, and the Limits of Human,” GLQ: A Journal of Lesbian and Gay Studies, Special Issue: Queer Inhumanisms, ed. Mel Y Chen and Dana Luciano (spring 2015)
- “Mammy-Memory: Staging Joice Heth, or the Current Phenomenon of the ‘Ancient Negress,’ “Women and Performance: a journal of feminist theory, Special Issue: Aging, Vol. 22, No. 1, March 2012, 29-46.
- “Crimes of Performance,” SOULS: A Critical Journal of Politics, Culture, and Society, Special Issue: Race, Crime, and Capital. Vol 13., Issue 1. 2011: 29–45.
- “Relics of the Future: The Aesthetic Wanderings of Simone Leigh.” Evidence of Accumulation (exhibition catalogue), New York: The Studio Museum of Harlem, 2011: 6–8.
- “Ellen Craft’s Radical Techniques of Subversion,” e-misferica: Performance and Politics in the Americas, Issue 5.2, Race and Its Others, 2008.
