= Urban Resource Institute =

Urban Resource Institute (URI) is a Manhattan-based nonprofit organization that offers services for survivors of domestic violence, the homeless, and adults who have been diagnosed with intellectual and developmental disabilities. Serving over 1,600 individuals annually, URI currently operates six domestic violence shelters, with over 600 beds, as well as three permanent residences for adults with intellectual and developmental disabilities. In addition, the organization operates programs and services to empower survivors of domestic violence and provide them with therapy and legal assistance. URI also provides support services for homeless families in 2 city-run shelters.

== History ==
Urban Resource Institute was founded in 1980 as an affiliate of the Addiction Research and Treatment Corporation and expanded into domestic violence services in 1984. In 1985, the organization established the Urban Center for the Developmentally Disabled. Urban Resource Institute continued to expand its services for individuals struggling with addiction, with the founding of its Marguerite T. Saunders Urban Center for Alcoholism and Addiction Services in 1988. In 1990, URI opened two permanent residences for adults with developmental disabilities. Through the 1990s and 2000s, URI continued to bolster its services catered toward survivors of domestic violence and adults with developmental disabilities.

Nathaniel M. Fields has been the president and CEO of Urban Resource Institute since 2012, when the organization split from its affiliate and became independent.

== People and Animals Living Safely (PALS) Program ==
Urban Resource Institute launched its PALS (People and Animals Living Safely) program in May 2013. PALS is the first program in New York and one of the few in the United States that allows domestic violence survivors to live in a shelter apartment with their pets. Through PALS, survivors live in pet-friendly apartments and have access to private dog parks so they can play with their pets outside without encountering their abusers.

In 2015, URI published a report on the connection between domestic violence and pet ownership that drew from two years of data collected from the PALS program.

As of 2025, PALS represents the nation's largest network of pet-inclusive shelters.

== Economic empowerment ==
Urban Resource Institute (URI) has several economic empowerment programs aimed at helping domestic violence survivors become self-sufficient and recover from economic abuse.

A key element of URI’s economic empowerment program is the Working Internship Network (WIN). Since 1998, WIN has successfully provided URI residents with valuable job training and internship opportunities in a variety of work settings. The program also provides residents with job-skill development services, including career-readiness and financial literacy workshops. Additionally, WIN includes career counseling, vocational and psychosocial assessments, job-readiness training, and resume-preparation assistance to help survivors of domestic violence secure the education and skills necessary to begin achieving financial freedom.

== Legal education and advocacy program ==
URI’s Domestic Violence Legal Education and Advocacy Program (LEAP) provides specialized, on-site legal services to the residents of the agency’s six domestic violence shelters. LEAP served 111 shelter residents in 2015. LEAP provides legal advice, referrals, and assistance on family law issues, including custody, visitation, orders of protection, child support, and divorce. LEAP also advocates on behalf of clients with the local police precincts and district attorneys’ offices.

== Homelessness programs ==
URI has been operating homeless shelters since 2016 and currently has shelters in Harlem and Queens. The Harlem Family Residence operates as a Tier II facility, providing 32 families with transitional housing and access to support services. The program for homeless families in Queens provides safe, temporary, emergency shelter and supportive services to 56 homeless families with children.

== Developmentally Disabled ==
URI’s Urban Center for the Developmentally Disabled (UCDD) provides one-on-one job counseling, training, placement, and job-site coaching services for individuals diagnosed with intellectual and developmental disabilities. UCDD serves individuals who have “aged out” of special education and provides transitional and supported employment opportunities and resources for adult students. Urban Resource Institute also manages two residential care facilities for individuals diagnosed with intellectual and developmental disabilities in Queens.

== Abusive Partner Intervention Program (APIP) ==
The Abusive Partner Intervention Program is URI’s most recently created program. It integrates a trauma-informed approach with batterer intervention services aimed at decreasing recidivism. URI works with Westchester County Department of Probation, Westchester Jewish Community Services, and other agencies and organizations, to develop more trauma-informed offender services in New York State. Additionally, the APIP works closely with the local Integrated Domestic Violence Court to ensure offender accountability. Individuals attend the APIP program for 65 weeks, with an at-home assignment and group session presentation each week.
