= Norman Lewis (artist) =

American painter (1909–1979)

- Self-Portrait (1939)
- Born: Norman Wilfred Lewis; July 23, 1909; New York City, U.S.
- Died: August 27, 1979 (aged 70); New York City, U.S.
- Occupation: Artist
- Known for: Painting
- Movement: Abstract expressionism

Norman Wilfred Lewis (July 23, 1909 – August 27, 1979) was an American painter, scholar, and teacher. Lewis, who was African-American and of Bermudian descent, was associated with abstract expressionism, and used representational strategies to focus on black urban life and his community's struggles.

== Early life and education ==
Lewis was born on July 23, 1909, in the Harlem neighborhood in New York City, New York. He was raised on 133rd Street, between 7th and 8th Avenues. Both of his parents were from Bermuda; his father, Wilfred Lewis, was a fisherman and later a dock foreman, and his mother, Diane Lewis, was a bakery owner and later a domestic worker. Norman was the second of three sons. His older brother, Saul, became a violinist, later playing jazz music with notable musicians such as Count Basie and Chick Webb.

Lewis attended Public School No. 5, which at the time had a primarily white student population. He was always interested in art, but did not express it in early childhood due to a lack of resources and being overshadowed by his musically gifted older brother.

As a young man, he started studying art through self-education and amassed a few commercial art books, initially practicing drawing from them. Often, he would get frustrated by the level of detail he could not achieve compared to the commercial art, unaware that he was copying the art at a different scale than they were produced at. He later started studying art history books with more success. His self-education got him started in his career, but it later complicated his relationship with teachers and other students, and he struggled with a full understanding of some of the lessons.

A lifelong resident of Harlem, starting around age 20 he also traveled extensively. For three years he worked on ocean freighters, traveling to South America and the Caribbean. When he returned from sea, he got a job as a textile and garment presser in a tailor's studio and met the artist Augusta Savage, whose art studio was in the basement of the tailor's shop. He studied art with Savage at the Savage Studio of Arts and Crafts in Harlem.

Savage was an important early influence who provided him with open studio space at her Harlem Community Art Center. Between 1933 and 1935, Lewis studied at Teachers College, Columbia University and at the John Reed Club Art School.

In 1934, he became a member of the 306 Group, a collection of African-American artists and writers who discussed art's role in society. Some well-known members were Savage, Romare Bearden, Ralph Ellison, Jacob Lawrence, and Richard Wright, as well as Charles Alston, who hosted the meetings in his studio. In 1935, he was a co-founder of the Harlem Artists Guild, whose members included Bearden, Selma Burke, and Beauford and Joseph Delaney. He participated in Works Progress Administration as an art teacher starting in 1935, alongside Jackson Pollock, among others. One of the places he worked at during his time in the WPA was the Harlem Community Art Center.

After the Works Progress Administration came to an end in 1943, Lewis found a job teaching at the newly established George Washington Carver School, a community school for students from low-income families in Harlem, where his colleagues included artists Elizabeth Catlett and Charles White, among others. From 1944 to 1949, he taught art at the Thomas Jefferson School of Social Science.

== Social realism and figurative work ==
Lewis began his career in 1930, with mostly figurative work and social realism. He at first painted what he saw, which ranged from Meeting Place (1930), a swap meet scene, and The Yellow Hat (1936), a formal Cubist painting, to Dispossessed (1940), an eviction scene, and Jazz Musicians (1948), a visual depiction of the bebop music that was being played in Harlem. His social realism was painted with "an overtly figurative style, depicting bread lines, evictions, and police brutality."

Lewis said that he struggled to express social conflict in his art, but in his later years, focused on the inherently aesthetic. "The goal of the artist must be aesthetic development," he told art historian Kellie Jones, "and in a universal sense, to make in his own way some contribution to culture."

== Abstraction ==
Jazz Band (1948)

In the late 1940s, Lewis's work became increasingly abstract. His total engagement with abstract expressionism was due partially to his disillusionment with the United States after his wartime experiences in World War II. It seemed extremely hypocritical that America was fighting "against an enemy whose master race ideology was echoed at home by the fact of a segregated armed forces." Seeing that art does not have the power to change the political state that society was in, he decided that people should develop their aesthetic skills more, instead of focusing on political art. Tenement I (1952), Harlem Turns White (1955), and Night Walker No. 2 (1956) are all examples of his style. Twilight Sounds (1947) and Jazz Band (1948) are examples of his interest in conveying music.

One of his best known paintings, Migrating Birds (1953), won the Popular Prize at the Carnegie Museum's 1955 Carnegie International Exhibition. Invturn the New York Herald-Tribune called the painting "one of the most significant of all events of the 1955 art year." His signature style in those decades included repetitive ideographic or hieroglyphic elements that allowed Lewis to incorporate narrative sequences into his paintings.

He became interested in the Abstract Expressionist movement and began attending meetings at Studio 35 with The Irascibles, at a loft at 35 East Eighth Street, Manhattan. He was the only African-American in attendance and it was through these meetings he met David Smith, Ad Reinhardt, Mark Tobey, and Richard Lippold. However Lewis did not fully embrace the Abstract Expressionist movement because "it did not favor all artists equally", and he was struggling with attaining collectors and museums despite his awards and prestigious exhibition history. Lewis was the only African-American artist among the first generation of abstract expressionists, but his work was overlooked by both White and African-American art dealers and gallery owners.

In his last 20 years, Lewis created and developed his very own blending of abstraction and figuration. His rhythmic lines and shapes now hinted at figures moving through his layers of colours. “Untitled” (ca. 1957) shows Lewis's transition from pure abstraction towards this new approach, that blends abstraction with figuration.

=== Spiral artist group (1963 to 1965) and artistic response to the U.S. civil rights movement and related subjects ===
Lewis was a founding member of Spiral, a group of artists and writers who met regularly between 1963 and 1965, that included Charles Alston, Romare Bearden, and Hale Woodruff. The group met "to discuss the potential of Black artists to engage with issues of racial equality and struggle in the 1960s through their work." The Spiral group disbanded in 1965, as a result of discrimination towards the group, and Lewis felt that protesting was a better way to bring attention and deal with the social issues than painting was.

Despite Spiral's short existence, it was very impactful in the art world, as it called attention to many issues of racial inequality that existed at the time. For instance, due to Spiral and other groups' continuous protest against the 1968 controversial exhibit Harlem on My Mind in the Metropolitan Museum of Art, Black people became more visible in the art world as did the importance of their genuine representation.

in his own artistic practice Lewis painted works which reference marches and parades of different origins and or intentions which have in recent years been labeled part and parcel of the category of his oeuvre "Procession". Among the notable works from this grouping said to be depicting marches in a hybrid realistic/abstract mode are "Evening Rendezvous" (1962 collection of the Smithsonian American Art Museum in Washington D.C.), "Unknown Title" (March on Washington) (1965 collection of the Michael Rosenfeld Gallery), and "Untitled" (1965 Collection of Seth Taffae Fine Art). One of the "Procession" paintings was executed on a chimney in South Dennis, Massachusetts on Cape Cod at the summer house of a Harlem couple.

=== Later work ===
In 1969, Lewis founded the Cinque Gallery in New York City, along with Romare Bearden and Ernest Crichlow. During the same year, Lewis protested in front of Metropolitan Museum of Art because of the highly controversial exhibition, Harlem On My Mind. His later work includes Alabama II (1969), Part Vision (1971), and New World Acoming (1971), as well as a series called Seachange done in his last years.

From 1965 to 1971, he taught art for the Harlem Youth in Action program. He started teaching at the Art Students League of New York starting in 1972 and worked there until his death in 1979.

== Death and legacy ==
In 1975, he married his long-time girlfriend, Ouida Bramwell. He never had any children of his own, but he was stepfather to Tarin Fuller, daughter of Bramwell. He died unexpectedly on August 27, 1979, at age 70, in New York City.

His body of work included paintings, drawings, and murals. Although he was represented by Willard Gallery, his only gallery representation, and he was the recipient of many awards and good reviews, his work did not sell nearly as well as the other Abstract Expressionists he exhibited with such as Mark Tobey or Mark Rothko. He was not included in important publications for Abstract Expressionism of the time, including The Triumph of American Painting: A History of Abstract Expressionism (1970) and The New York School: The Painters and Sculptors of the Fifties (1978) by Irving Sandler and never mentioned in the writings of Dore Ashton.

== Exhibitions and collections ==
Lewis' first major exhibition was in 1934 at the Metropolitan Museum of Art, where he received an honorable mention for his painting titled The Wanderer (Johnny). In 1946, he was accepted into the Marian Willard Gallery located in New York, which is where he had his first solo exhibition three years later.

Lewis's work was included in group exhibitions 1951 at the Museum of Modern Art and in 1952, at the Whitney Museum of American Art.

The first retrospective of his life's work was displayed at the City University of New York Graduate Center in 1976. The exhibition Black Paintings, 1946-1977 at the Studio Museum in Harlem in 1998 was dedicated to his paintings that centered on the color black. Another solo exhibition was Norman Lewis, from the Harlem Renaissance to Abstraction in the Kenkeleba Gallery in New York in 1989.

From the Margins: Lee Krasner and Norman Lewis, 1945–1952at the Jewish Museum in Manhattan in 2014 and Procession: The Art of Norman Lewis at the Pennsylvania Academy of Fine Arts (which then traveled to the Amon Carter Museum of American Art in Fort Worth, Texas and the Chicago Cultural Center in Chicago, Illinois) in 2015 attempted to give Lewis and the other black artists credit for their involvement in the abstract expressionism movement that they did not receive while living.

His work is included in many public museum collections including the Museum of Modern Art (MoMA) in New York City, Smithsonian American Art Museum, the Metropolitan Museum of Art, the Art Institute of Chicago, Blanton Museum of Art, and the High Museum of Art, among others.

== Awards ==
For the Congress of Industrial Organization in 1943, he won a competition by designing a war relief poster. At the Pittsburgh International Exhibition at the Carnegie Institute in 1955, his painting Migrating Birds (1953) was awarded the Popularity Prize by visitors.

In 1972, he received a grant from the Mark Rothko Foundation and a Fellowship from the National Endowment for the Arts (NEA). In 1975, he received a Guggenheim Fellowship for painting.

== Bibliography ==
Listed by ascending date:

=== Art portfolios ===
- Impressions: Our World, Volume I (a portfolio of seven etchings – five with aquatint, two with embossing). Emma Amos, Benny Andrews, Vivian Browne, Eldzier Cortor, Norman Lewis, Vincent Smith, John Wilson (all were collaborating artists) (35 ed.). New York City, New York: Printmaking Workshop. 1974.

=== Art exhibition catalogues ===
- Norman Lewis, from the Harlem Renaissance to Abstraction: May 7, 1989–June 25, 1989 (exhibition catalogue). New York City, New York: National Endowment for the Arts, Kenkeleba Gallery. 1989. ISBN 978-0890622407.
- "Norman W. Lewis, The Second Transition: 1947-1951", 1994, Bill Hodges Gallery
- Craven, David; Gibson, Ann Eden; Sims, Lowery S.; Veneciano, Jorge D.; Salomon, Stephanie (1998). Norman Lewis: Black Paintings, 1946-1977 (exhibition catalogue). New York City, New York: Studio Museum in Harlem. ISBN 978-0942949001.
- 25 Highly Important Paintings by Norman Lewis (exhibition catalogue). New York City, New York: Bill Hodges Gallery. 1998.
- Inniss, Susan (2002). Norman W. Lewis – Linear Abstractions (exhibition catalogue). New York City, New York: Bill Hodegs Gallery. ISBN 1-891978-16-0.
- Anfam, David (2009). Norman Lewis: PULSE, A Centennial Exhibition (exhibition catalogue). New York City, New York: Michael Rosenfeld Gallery.
- Norman Lewis: A Painter's Odyssey 1935-1979. New York City, New York: Bill Hodges Gallery. 2009. ISBN 978-1891978265.
- Kleeblatt, Norman L.; Brown, Stephen; Saltzman, Lisa; Bagneris, Amanda (2014). From the Margins: Lee Krasner, Norman Lewis, 1945–1952 (exhibition catalogue). New York City, New York: Jewish Museum. ISBN 978-0300206494.
- Acton, David; Fine, Ruth (2015). Procession: The Art of Norman Lewis (exhibition catalogue). Andrianna Campbell (Contributor), David C. Driskell (Contributor), Jacqueline Francis (Contributor), Helen M. Shannon (Contributor), Jeffrey C. Stewart (Contributor). Pennsylvania Academy of the Fine Arts (PAFA), University of California Press. ISBN 978-0520288003.
- Campbell, Adrianna; Oshima, Tetsuya (2018). Norman Lewis: Looking East. Columbus College of Art and Design, Michael Rosenfeld Gallery.

=== Art history books ===
- Herskovic, Marika (2003). American Abstract Expressionism of the 1950s: An Illustrated Survey: with Artists' Statements, Artwork, and Biographies. Franklin Lakes, N.J.: New York School Press. pp. 206–209. ISBN 0967799414. OCLC 50253062.
- Marter, Joan M. (2007). Abstract Expressionism: The International Context. New Brunswick, New Jersey: Rutgers University Press. ISBN 9780813539751.
- Lock, Graham; Murray, David (2009). "'Pure Eye Music': Norman Lewis, Abstract Expressionism, and Bebop". The Hearing Eye: Jazz & Blues Influences in African American Visual Art. Oxford University Press. ISBN 9780195340518.

== See also ==
- American Totem
- Evening Rendezvous
- List of Federal Art Project artists
- Migrating Birds
