= Evening Rendezvous =

1962 painting by Norman Lewis

Evening Rendezvous is a 1962 oil on canvas painting by Norman Lewis (1909-1979). The work along with an earlier noted Lewis painting , American Totem (1960) was executed as part of a group of paintings by the artist which examine the effects of the American civil rights movement. Evening Rendezvous is also part of a group of series of paintings by Lewis later labeled "Processions".

The painting, which veers between realism and abstraction, is said to employ its colors in painting its picture. The white figures are meant to be hooded and robed members of the American racist hate group, the Ku Klux Klan, the blue the smoke from their campfires, and the burning reds the light from the headlights of their automobiles. The painting is held in the permanent collection of the Smithsonian American Art Museum.

== See also ==
- The American People Series 20: Die
