= Charles Alston =

American artist (1907–1977)

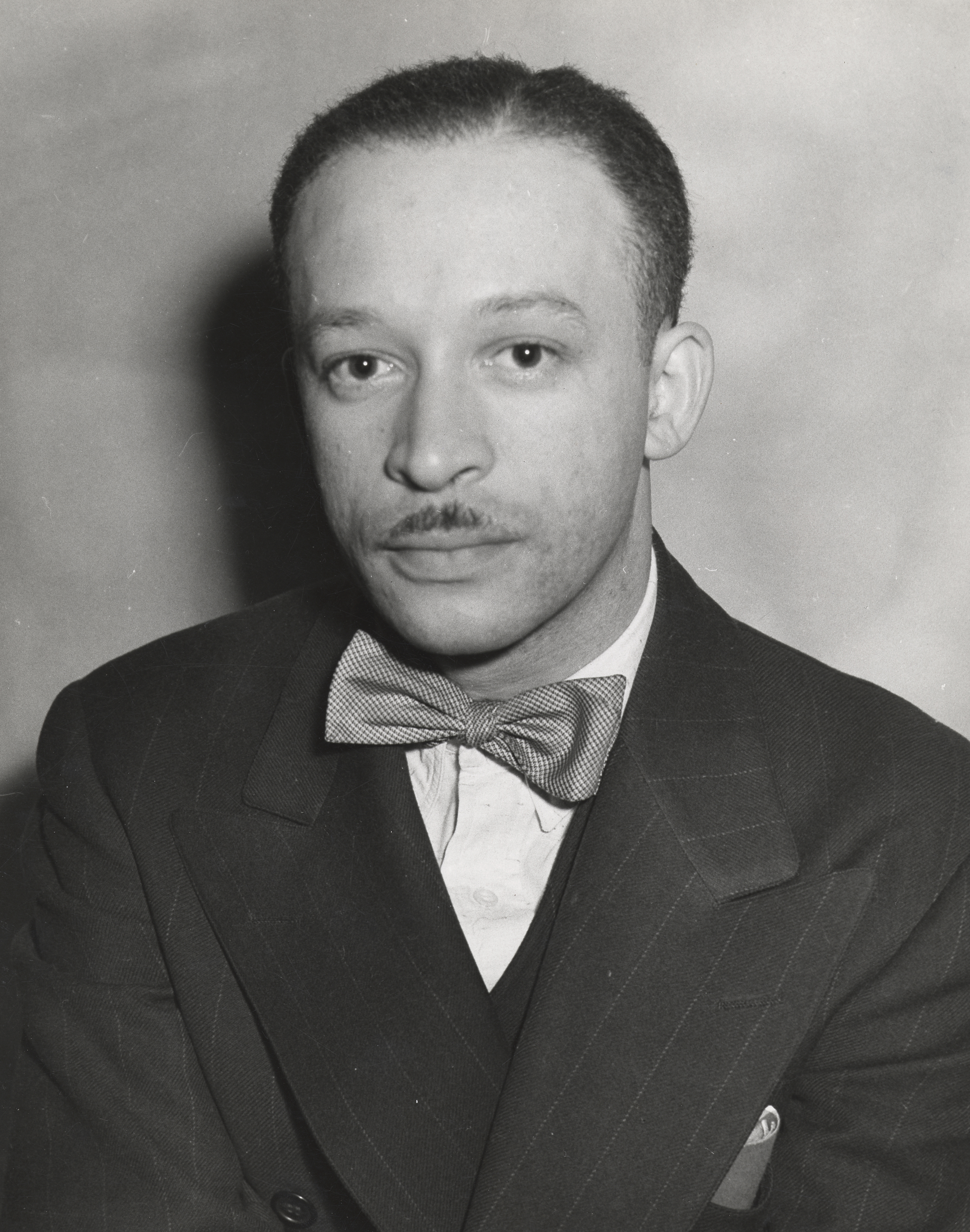
- Alston in 1939
- Born: Charles Henry Alston; November 28, 1907; Charlotte, North Carolina, U.S.
- Died: April 27, 1977 (aged 69); New York City, U.S.
- Education: Columbia University, Teachers College
- Known for: Muralism, painting, illustration, sculpture
- Movement: Abstract expressionism
- Spouse: Myra Adele Logan
- Patrons: Lemoine Deleaver Pierce

Charles Henry "Spinky" Alston (November 28, 1907 – April 27, 1977) was an American painter, sculptor, illustrator, muralist and teacher who lived and worked in the New York City neighborhood of Harlem. Alston was active in the Harlem Renaissance; Alston was the first African-American supervisor for the Works Progress Administration's Federal Art Project. Alston designed and painted murals at the Harlem Hospital and the Golden State Mutual Life Insurance Building. In 1990, Alston's bust of Martin Luther King Jr. became the first image of an African American displayed at the White House.

== Personal life ==
=== Early life ===
Charles Henry Alston was born on November 28, 1907, in Charlotte, North Carolina, to Reverend Primus Priss Alston and Anna Elizabeth (Miller) Alston, as the youngest of five children. Three survived past infancy: Charles, his older sister Rousmaniere and his older brother Wendell. His father had been born into slavery in 1851 in Pittsboro, North Carolina. After the Civil War, he gained an education and graduated from St. Augustine's College in Raleigh. He became a prominent minister and founder of St. Michael's Episcopal Church, with an African-American congregation. The senior Alston was described as a "race man": an African American who dedicated his skills to the furtherance of the Black race. Reverend Alston met his wife when she was a student at his school. Charles was nicknamed "Spinky" by his father, and kept the nickname as an adult. In 1910, when Charles was three, his father died suddenly of a cerebral hemorrhage. Locals described his father as the "Booker T. Washington of Charlotte".

In 1913, Anna Alston married Harry Bearden, Romare Bearden's uncle, making Charles and Romare cousins. The two Bearden families lived across the street from each other; the friendship between Romare and Charles would last a lifetime.

As a child, Alston was inspired by his older brother Wendell's drawings of trains and cars, which the young artist copied. Alston also played with clay, creating a sculpture of North Carolina. As an adult he reflected on his memories of sculpting with clay as a child: "I'd get buckets of it and put it through strainers and make things out of it. I think that's the first art experience I remember, making things." His mother was a skilled embroiderer and took up painting at the age of 75. His father was also good at drawing, having wooed Alston's mother Anna with small sketches in the medians of letters he wrote her.

In 1915, the Bearden/Alston family moved to New York, as many African-American families did during the Great Migration. Alston's step-father, Henry Bearden, left before his wife and children in order to get work. He secured a job overseeing elevator operations and the newsstand staff at the Bretton Hotel on the Upper West Side. The family lived in Harlem and was considered middle-class. During the Great Depression, the people of Harlem suffered economically. The "stoic strength" seen within the community was later expressed in Charles' fine art. At Public School 179 in Manhattan, the boy's artistic abilities were recognized and he was asked to draw all of the school posters during his years there.

In 1917, Harry and Anna Bearden had a daughter together, Aida C. Bearden, who would later marry operatic baritone Lawrence Whisonant.

=== Higher education ===
Alston graduated from DeWitt Clinton High School, where he was nominated for academic excellence and was the art editor of the school's magazine, The Magpie. He was a member of the Arista - National Honor Society and also studied drawing and anatomy at the Saturday school of the National Academy of Art. In high school he was given his first oil paints and learned about his aunt Bessye Bearden's art salons, which stars like Duke Ellington and Langston Hughes attended. After graduating in 1925, he attended Columbia University, turning down a scholarship to the Yale School of Fine Arts.

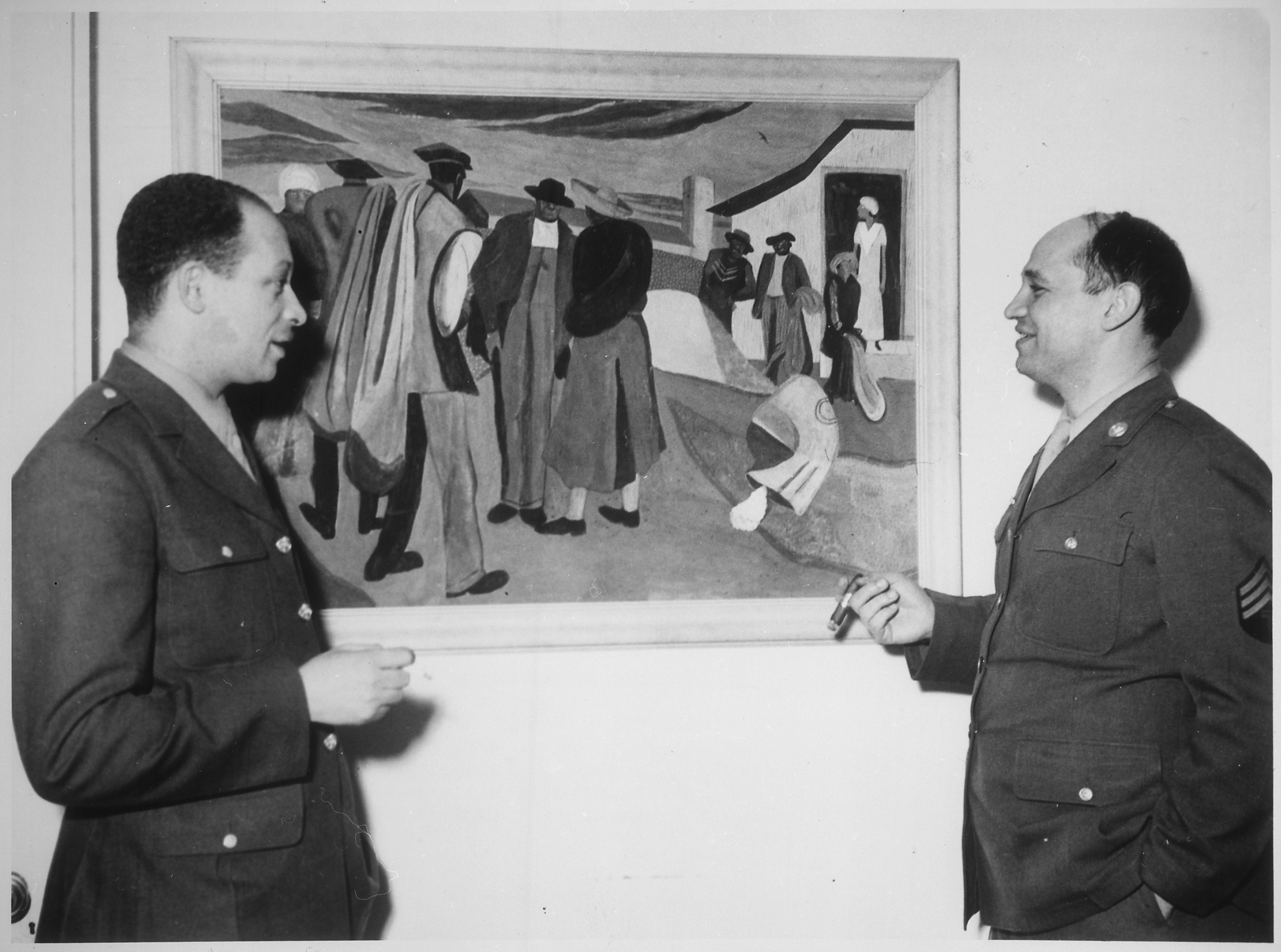
Pvt. Alston with his art student and cousin, Romare Bearden (right), discussing one of his paintings, Cotton Workers, in 1944. Both were members of the 372nd Infantry Regiment stationed in New York City.

Alston entered the pre-architectural program but lost interest after realizing what difficulties many African-American architects had in the field. After also taking classes in pre-med, he decided that math, physics and chemistry "was not just my bag", and he entered the fine arts program. During his time at Columbia, Alston joined Alpha Phi Alpha, worked on the university's Columbia Daily Spectator, and drew cartoons for the school's magazine Jester. He also explored Harlem restaurants and clubs, where his love for jazz and black music would be fostered. In 1929, he graduated and received the Arthur Wesley Dow fellowship to study at Teachers College, where he obtained his Master's in 1931.

=== Later life ===
For the years 1942 and 1943 Alston was stationed in the army at Fort Huachuca in Arizona. While working on a mural project at Harlem Hospital, he met Myra Adele Logan, then an surgical intern at the hospital. They were married on April 8, 1944. Their home, which included his studio, was on Edgecombe Avenue near Highbridge Park. The couple lived close to family; at their frequent gatherings Alston enjoyed cooking and Myra played piano. During the 1940s Alston also took occasional art classes, studying under Alexander Kostellow.

On April 27, 1977, Alston died after a long bout with cancer, just months after his wife died from lung cancer. His memorial service was held at St. Martin's Episcopal Church in New York City, on May 21, 1977.

== Professional career ==
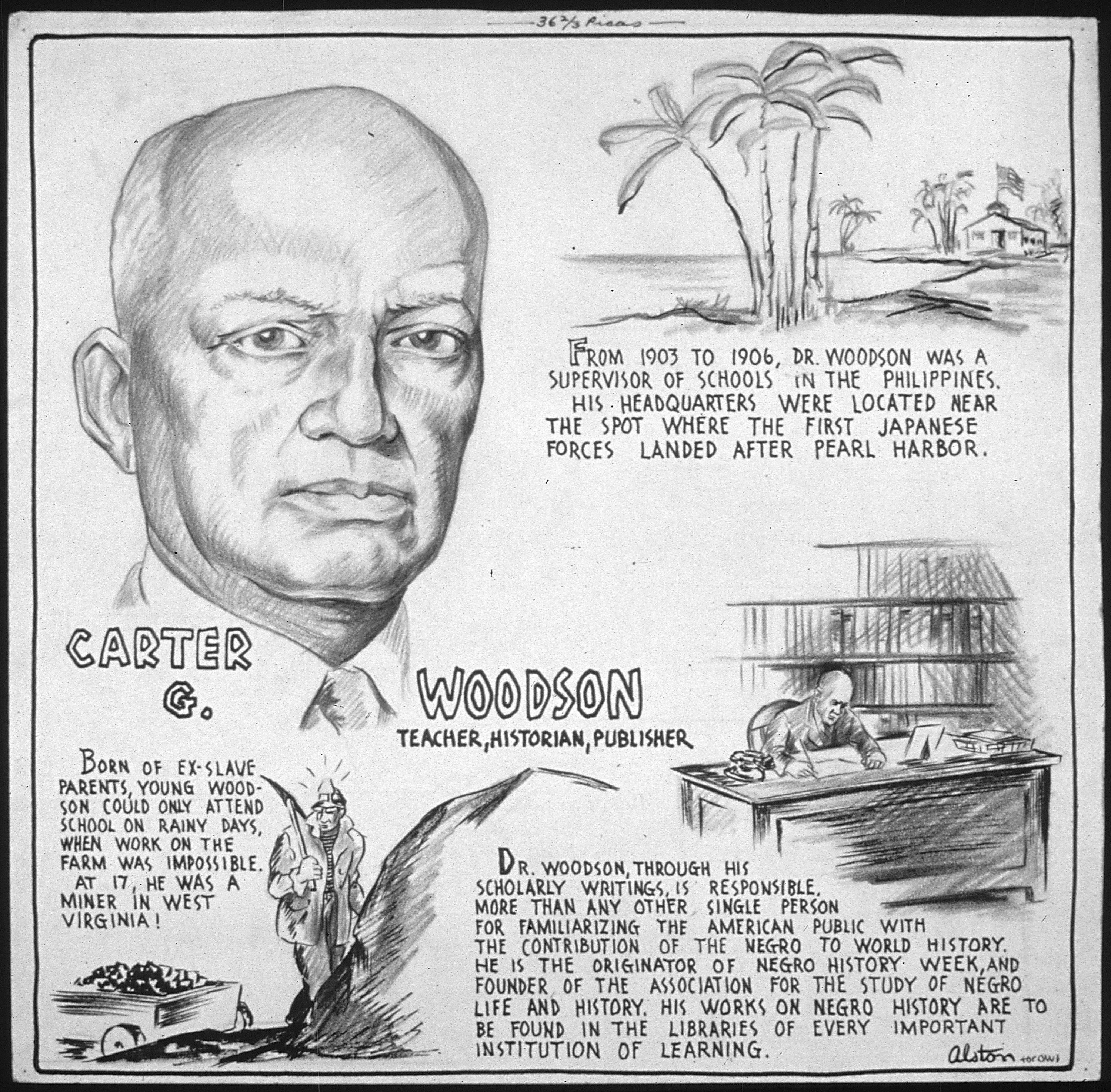
Alston's illustration of African-American historian Carter G. Woodson for the Office of War Information

While obtaining his master's degree, Alston was the boys' work director at the Utopia Children's House, started by James Lesesne Wells. He also began teaching at the Harlem Community Art Center, founded by Augusta Savage in the basement of what is now the Schomburg Center for Research in Black Culture. Alston's teaching style was influenced by the work of John Dewey, Arthur Wesley Dow, and Thomas Munro. During this period, Alston began to teach the 10-year-old Jacob Lawrence, whom he strongly influenced. Alston was introduced to African art by the poet Alain Locke. In the late 1920s, Alston joined Bearden and other black artists who refused to exhibit in William E. Harmon Foundation shows, which featured all-black artists in their traveling exhibits. Alston and his friends thought the exhibits were curated for a white audience, a form of segregation which the men protested. They did not want to be set aside but exhibited on the same level as art peers of every skin color.

In 1938, the Rosenwald Fund provided money for Alston to travel to the South, which was his first return there since leaving as a child. His travel with Giles Hubert, an inspector for the Farm Security Administration, gave him access to certain situations and he photographed many aspects of rural life. These photographs served as the basis for a series of genre portraits depicting southern black life. In 1940, he completed Tobacco Farmer, the portrait of a young black farmer in white overalls and a blue shirt with a youthful yet serious look upon his face, sitting in front of the landscape and buildings he works on and in. That same year Alston received a second round of funding from the Rosenwald Fund to travel South, and he spent extended time at Atlanta University.

During the 1930s and early 1940s, Alston created illustrations for magazines such as Fortune, Mademoiselle, The New Yorker, Melody Maker and others. He also designed album covers for artists such as Duke Ellington and Coleman Hawkins, as well as book covers for Eudora Welty and Langston Hughes. Alston became staff artist at the Office of War Information and Public Relations in 1940, creating drawings of notable African Americans. These images were used in over 200 black newspapers across the country by the government to "foster goodwill with the black citizenry."

Alston left commercial work to focus on his own artwork, and 1950 he became the first African-American instructor at the Art Students League, where he remained on faculty until 1971. In 1950, his Painting was exhibited at the Metropolitan Museum of Art, and his artwork was one of the few pieces purchased by the museum. He landed his first solo exhibition in 1953 at the John Heller Gallery, which represented artists such as Roy Lichtenstein. He exhibited there five times from 1953 to 1958.

In 1956, Alston became the first African-American instructor at the Museum of Modern Art, where he taught for a year before going to Belgium on behalf of MoMA and the United States Department of State. He coordinated the children's community center at Expo 58. In 1958, he was awarded a grant from and was elected as a member of the American Academy of Arts and Letters.

In 1963, Alston co-founded Spiral with his cousin Romare Bearden and Hale Woodruff. Spiral served as a collective of conversation and artistic exploration for a large group of artists who "addressed how black artists should relate to American society in a time of segregation." Artists and arts supporters gathered for Spiral, such as Emma Amos, Perry Ferguson and Merton Simpson. This group served as the 1960s version of the 306 Group. Alston was described as an "intellectual activist", and in 1968 he spoke at Columbia about his activism. In the mid-1960s, Spiral organized an exhibition of black and white artworks, but the exhibition was never officially sponsored by the group, due to internal disagreements.

In 1968, Alston received a presidential appointment from Lyndon Johnson to the National Council of Culture and the Arts. Mayor John Lindsay appointed him to the New York City Art Commission in 1969.

In 1973, he was made full professor at City College of New York, where he had taught since 1968. In 1975, he was awarded the first Distinguished Alumni Award from Teachers College. The Art Student's League created a 21-year merit scholarship in 1977 under Alston's name to commemorate each year of his tenure.

=== Painting a person and a culture ===
Alston shared studio space with Henry Bannarn at 306 W. 141st Street, which served as an open space for artists, photographers, musicians, writers and the like. Other artists held studio space at 306, such as Jacob Lawrence, Addison Bates and his brother Leon. During this time Alston founded the Harlem Artists Guild with Savage and Elba Lightfoot to work toward equality in Works Progress Administration art programs in New York. During the early years of 306, Alston focused on mastering portraiture. His early works such as Portrait of a Man (1929) show Alston's detailed and realistic style depicted through pastels and charcoals, inspired by the style of Winold Reiss. In his Girl in a Red Dress (1934) and The Blue Shirt (1935), Alston used modern and innovative techniques for his portraits of young individuals in Harlem. Blue Shirt is thought to be a portrait of Jacob Lawrence. During this time he also created Man Seated with Travel Bag (c. 1938–40), showing the seedy and bleak environment, contrasting with work like the racially charged Vaudeville (c. 1930) and its caricature style of a man in blackface.

Inspired by his trip south, Alston began his "family series" in the 1940s. Intensity and angularity come through in the faces of the youth in his portraits Untitled (Portrait of a Girl) and Untitled (Portrait of a Boy). These works also show the influence that African sculpture had on his portraiture, with Portrait of a Boy showing more cubist features. Later family portraits show Alston's exploration of religious symbolism, color, form and space. His family group portraits are often faceless, which Alston states is the way that white America views blacks. Paintings such as Family (1955) show a woman seated and a man standing with two children – the parents seem almost solemn while the children are described as hopeful and with a use of color made famous by Cézanne. In Family Group (c. 1950) Alston's use of gray and ochre tones brings together the parents and son as if one with geometric patterns connecting them together as if a puzzle. The simplicity of the look, style and emotion upon the family is reflective and probably inspired by Alston's trip south. His work during this time has been described as being "characterized by his reductive use of form combined with a sun-hued" palette. During this time he also started to experiment with ink and wash painting, which is seen in work such as Portrait of a Woman (1955), as well as creating portraits to illustrate the music surrounding him in Harlem. Blues Singer #4 shows a female singer on stage with a white flower on her shoulder and a bold red dress. Girl in a Red Dress is thought to be Bessie Smith, whom he drew many times when she was recording and performing. Jazz was an important influence in Alston's work and social life, which he expressed in such works as Jazz (1950) and Harlem at Night.

The 1960s civil rights movement influenced his work deeply, and he made artworks expressing feelings related to inequality and race relations in the United States. One of his few religious artworks was Christ Head (1960), which had an angular "Modiglianiesque" portrait of Jesus Christ. Seven years later he created You never really meant it, did you, Mr. Charlie? which, in a similar style as Christ Head, shows a black man standing against a red sky "looking as frustrated as any individual can look", according to Alston.

==== Modernism ====
Experimenting with the use of negative space and organic forms in the late 1940s, by the mid-1950s Alston began creating notably modernist style paintings. Woman with Flowers (1949) has been described as a tribute to Modigliani. Ceremonial (1950) shows that he was influenced by African art. Untitled works during this era show his use of color overlay, using muted colors to create simple layered abstracts of still lifes. Symbol (1953) relates to Picasso's Guernica, which was a favorite work of Alston's.

His final work of the 1950s, Walking, was inspired by the Montgomery bus boycott. It is taken to represent "the surge of energy among African Americans to organize in their struggle for full equality." Alston is quoted as saying, "The idea of a march was growing....It was in the air...and this painting just came. I called it Walking on purpose. It wasn't the militancy that you saw later. It was a very definite walk-not going back, no hesitation."

==== Black and white ====
The civil rights movement of the 1960s was a major influence on Alston. In the late 1950s, he began working in black and white, which he continued up until the mid-1960s, and the period is considered one of his most powerful. Some of the works are simple abstracts of black ink on white paper, similar to a Rorschach test. Untitled (c. 1960s) shows a boxing match, with an attempt to express the drama of the fight through few brushstrokes. Alston worked with oil-on-Masonite during this period as well, using impasto, cream, and ochre to create a moody cave-like artwork. Black and White #1 (1959) is one of Alston's more "monumental" works. Gray, white and black come together to fight for space on an abstract canvas, in a softer form than the more harsh Franz Kline. Alston continued to explore the relationship between monochromatic hues throughout the series which Wardlaw describes as "some of the most profoundly beautiful works of twentieth-century American art."

=== Murals ===
Charles Alston's early mural work was inspired by the work of Aaron Douglas, Diego Rivera and José Clemente Orozco. He met Orozco when they did mural work in New York. In 1943, Alston was elected to the board of directors of the National Society of Mural Painters. He created murals for the Harlem Hospital, Golden State Mutual, American Museum of Natural History, Public School 154, the Bronx Family and Criminal Court, and the Abraham Lincoln High School in Brooklyn, New York.

==== Harlem Hospital murals ====
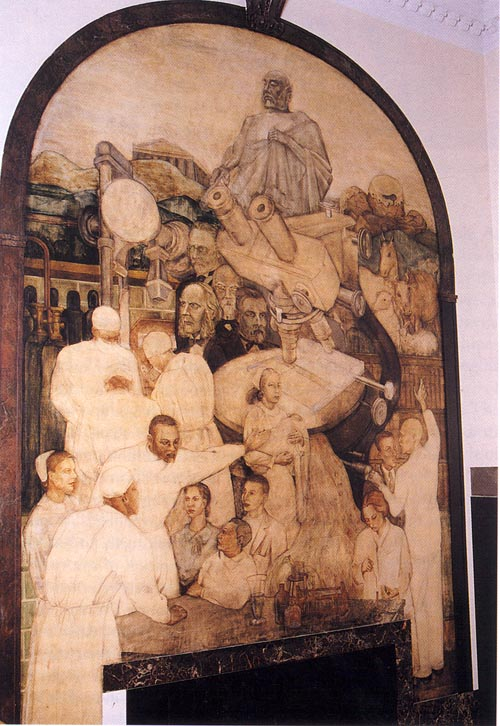
Modern Medicine (1936) at the Harlem Hospital

Originally hired as an easel painter, in 1935 Alston became the first African-American supervisor to work for the Works Progress Administration's Federal Art Project (FAP) in New York. This was his first mural. At this time he was awarded Works Progress Administration Project Number 1262 – an opportunity to oversee a group of artists creating murals and to supervise their painting for the Harlem Hospital. It was the first government commission ever awarded to African-American artists, who included Beauford Delaney, Seabrook Powell and Vertis Hayes. He also had the chance to create and paint his own contribution to the collection: Magic in Medicine and Modern Medicine. These paintings were part of a diptych completed in 1936 depicting the history of medicine in the African-American community and Beauford Delaney served as assistant. When creating the murals, Alston was inspired by the work of Aaron Douglas, who a year earlier had created the public art piece Aspects of Negro Life for the New York Public Library. He had researched traditional African culture, including traditional African medicine. Magic in Medicine, which depicts African culture and holistic healing, is considered one of "America's first public scenes of Africa". All of the mural sketches submitted were accepted by the FAP; however, hospital superintendent Lawrence T. Dermody and commissioner of hospitals S.S. Goldwater rejected four proposals, due to what they said was an excessive amount of African-American representation in the works. The artists fought their response, writing letters to gain support. Four years later they succeeded in gaining the right to complete the murals. The sketches for Magic in Medicine and Modern Medicine were exhibited in the Museum of Modern Art's "New Horizons in American Art".

===== Condition =====
Alston's murals were hung in the Women's Pavilion of the hospital over uncapped radiators, which caused the paintings to deteriorate from the steam. Plans failed to recap the radiators. In 1959, Alston estimated, in a letter to the New York State Department of Public Works, that the conservation would cost $1,500 but the funds were never acquired. In 1968, after the assassination of Martin Luther King Jr., Alston was asked to create another mural for the hospital, to be placed in a pavilion named after the slain civil rights movement leader. It was to be titled Man Emerging from the Darkness of Poverty and Ignorance into the Light of a Better World.

One year after Alston's death in 1977, a group of artists and historians, including the renowned painter and collagist Romare Bearden and art historian Greta Berman, together with administrators from the hospital, and from the New York City Art Commission, examined the murals, and presented a proposal for their restoration to then-mayor Ed Koch. The request was approved, and conservator Alan Farancz set to work in 1979, rescuing the murals from further decay. Many years passed, and the murals began to deteriorate again – especially the Alston works, which continued to suffer effects from the radiators. In 1991, the Municipal Art Society's Adopt-a-Mural program was launched, and the Harlem Hospital murals were chosen for further restoration (Greta Berman. Personal experience). A grant from Alston's sister Rousmaniere Wilson and step-sister Aida Bearden Winters assisted in completing a restoration of the works in 1993. In 2005, Harlem Hospital announced a $2 million project to conserve Alston's murals and three other pieces in the original commissioned project as part of a $225 million hospital expansion.

==== Golden State Mutual murals ====
In the late 1940s, Alston became involved in a mural project commissioned by Golden State Mutual Life Insurance Company, which asked the artists to create work related to African-American contributions to the settling of California. Alston worked with Hale Woodruff on the murals in a large studio space in New York; they used ladders to reach the upper parts of the canvas. The artworks, which are considered "priceless contributions to American narrative art", consist of two panels: Exploration and Colonization by Alston and Settlement and Development by Woodruff. Alston's piece covers the period of 1527 to 1850. Images of mountain man James Beckwourth, Biddy Mason, and William Leidesdorff are portrayed in the well-detailed historical mural. Both artists kept in contact with African Americans on the West Coast during creation of the murals, which influenced their content and depictions. The murals were unveiled in 1949, and have been on display in the lobby of the Golden State Mutual Headquarters.

Due to economic downturn in the early 21st century, Golden State was forced to sell their entire art collection to ward off its mounting debts. As of spring 2011 the National Museum of African American History and Culture had offered $750,000 to purchase the artworks. This generated controversy, as the artworks have been estimated to be worth at least $5 million. Supporters tried to protect the murals by gaining city landmark protections by the Los Angeles Conservancy. The state of California had declined philanthropic proposals to keep the murals in their original location, and the Smithsonian Institution withdrew their offer. The disposition of the murals are subject to a court case over jurisdiction, which was unresolved in the spring of 2011. This was resolved later in 2011 when the Golden State Mutual Life Insurance building was added to the National Register of Historic Places. The building was purchased by Community Impact Development, a partnership formed to provide a new home for the South Central Los Angeles Regional Center, an agency that provides services to people with developmental disabilities. The building was renovated in 2015. The murals remain in the lobby.

=== Sculpture ===
Alston also created sculptures. Head of a Woman (1957) shows his shift toward a "reductive and modern approach to sculpture....where facial features were suggested rather than fully formulated in three dimensions,". In 1970, Alston was commissioned by the Community Church of New York to create a bust of Martin Luther King Jr. for $5,000, with only five copies produced. In 1990, Alston's bronze bust of Martin Luther King Jr. (1970), became the first image of an African American to be displayed in the White House. When Barack Obama became the first black president in 2009, he brought the bust of Martin Luther King Jr. into the Oval Office, replacing a bust of Winston Churchill. This marked the first time an image of an African American was displayed in the president's work quarters. Furthermore, the bust became a predominant work seen in official portraits of visiting dignitaries. Now, a second copy of the famous Martin Luther King Jr. bust is displayed in Washington for the public to view up close.

=== World War II propaganda ===
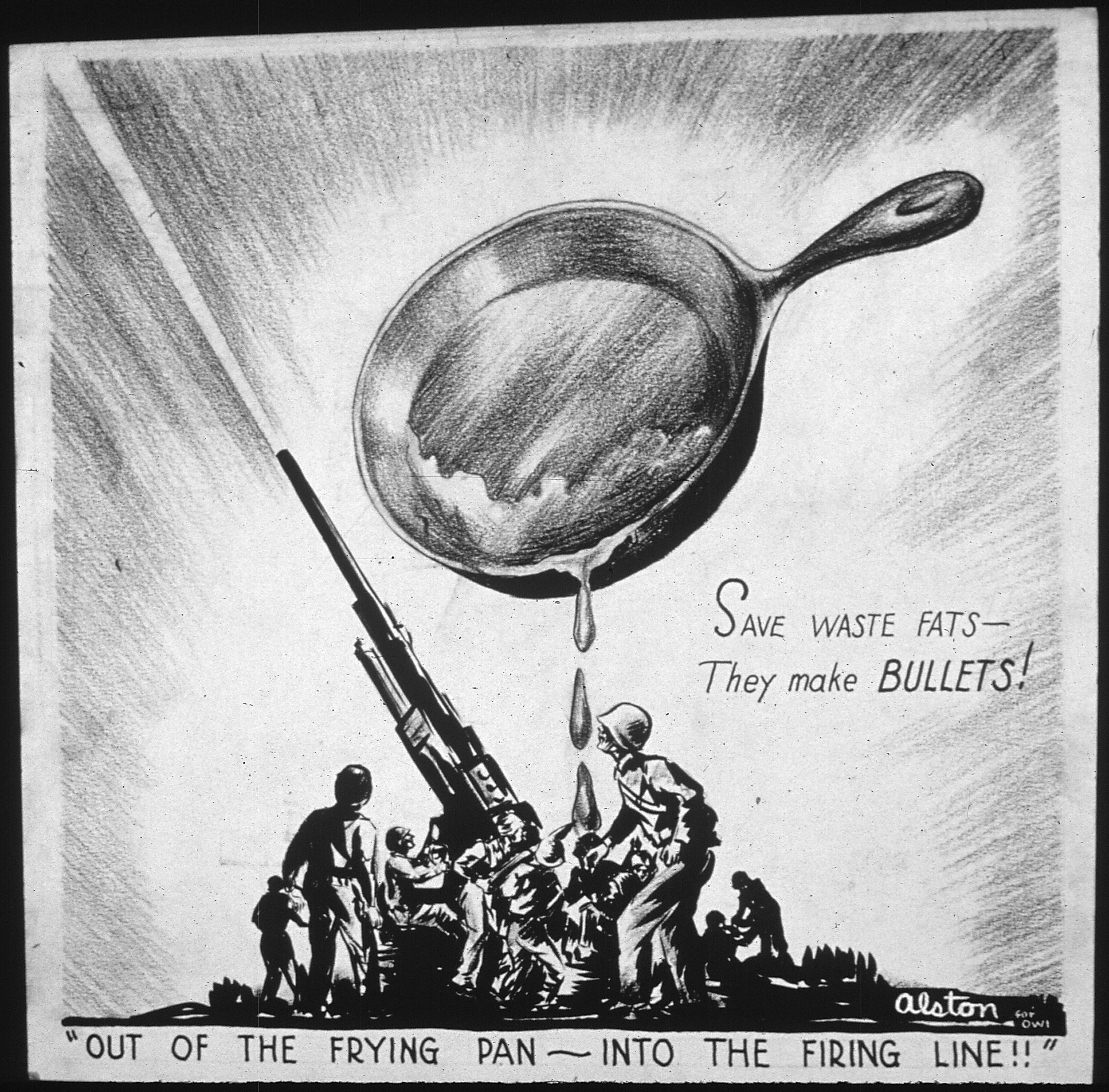
Artworks Promoting the War Effort and Original Sketches by Charles Alston, compiled ca. 1942 - ca. 1945

During World War II, scholars have theorized that the black press strived to appeal to the black readers, while also appeasing the U.S. government by supporting the war. Alston produced over one hundred government propagandistic illustrations that supported the national position on the war for the U.S. Office of War Information. Simultaneously, the cartoons were targeted to a black audience, designed exclusively for publication in the weekly black newspapers to address specific, controversial issues in the black community.

=== Reception ===
Art critic Emily Genauer stated that Alston "refused to be pigeonholed", regarding his varied exploration in his artwork. Patron Lemoine Deleaver Pierce said of Alston's work: "Never thought of as an innovative artist, Alston generally ignored popular art trends and violated many mainstream art conventions; he produced abstract and figurative paintings often simultaneously, refusing to be stylistically consistent, and during his 40-year career he worked prolifically and unapologetically in both commercial and fine art." Romare Bearden described Alston as "...one of the most versatile artists whose enormous skill led him to a diversity of styles..." Bearden also describes the professionalism and impact that Alston had on Harlem and the African-American community: "'was a consummate artist and a voice in the development of African American art who never doubted the excellence of all people's sensitivity and creative ability. During his long professional career, Alston significantly enriched the cultural life of Harlem. In a profound sense, he was a man who built bridges between Black artists in varying fields, and between other Americans." Writer June Jordan described Alston as "an American artist of first magnitude, and he is a Black American artist of undisturbed integrity."

== Major exhibitions ==
- A Force for Change, group show, 2009, Spertus Museum, Chicago
- Canvasing the Movement, group show, 2009, Reginald F. Lewis Museum of Maryland African American History & Culture
- On Higher Ground: Selections From the Walter O. Evans Collection, group show, 2001, Henry Ford Museum, Michigan
- Rhapsodies in Black: Art of the Harlem Renaissance, group show, 1998, Corcoran Gallery of Art, Washington, D.C.
- In the Spirit of Resistance: African-American Modernists and the Mexican Muralist School, group show, 1996, The Studio Museum in Harlem, New York
- Charles Alston: Artist and Teacher, 1990, Kenkeleba Gallery, New York
- Masters and Pupils: The Education of the Black Artist in New York, 1986, Jamaica Arts Center, New York
- Hundred Anniversary Exhibition of Paintings and Sculpture, 1975, Art Students League of New York, New York
- Solo exhibition, 1969, Huntington Hartford Gallery of Modern Art, New York.
- Solo exhibition, 1968, Fairleigh Dickinson University, New Jersey
- A Tribute to Negro Artists in Honor of the 100th Anniversary of the Emancipation Proclamation, group show, 1963, Albany Institute of History and Art

== Major collections ==
- Hampton University
- Harmon and Harriet Kelly Foundation for the Arts
- National Association for the Advancement of Colored People
- Kalamazoo Institute of Arts, Kalamazoo, Michigan
- National Gallery of Art
- National Museum of African American History and Culture
- Whitney Museum of American Art

== Notes ==
32. ^"Charles Alston, Artist and Teacher." African American Registry. 30 July 2020. Web. 10 March 2021. Charles Alston, Artist, and Teacher born
