= 306 Group =

The 306 Group were a collective of African American artists who worked and socialized together in Harlem, New York City in the 1930s. The name of the group was derived from the address of a studio space, 306 W. 141st Street, used by two of the artists, Charles Alston and Henry Bannarn. Many of these artists also worked with the Federal Art Project.

Notable artists who were part of this group include Jacob Lawrence, Elba Lightfoot, Robert Blackburn, Augusta Savage, Norman Lewis, and Romare Bearden.
