= Migrating Birds (Lewis) =

Migrating Birds is a 1953 oil on canvas painting by the abstract expressionist painter Norman Lewis (1909–1979). The painting is said to abstractly depict the actions of "Migrating Birds".

The work won the "Popular Prize" at the 1955 Carnegie International at the Carnegie Museum of Art in Pittsburgh, Pennsylvania.

In the Courier-Post, a South Jersey newspaper, art reviewer Fred B. Adelson wrote, "In such key mature works as "Jazz Musicians," "Migrating Birds" or "Exodus," Lewis' calligraphy of drawn lines seems like pictographs to suggest figural references. At the same time, his paint surfaces of varied textures and patterns that include a combing effect enhance the visual experience".
