= Louise E. Jefferson =

African-American artist, graphic designer, publishing director

- Born: 1908; Washington, DC
- Died: 2002 (aged 93–94); Litchfield, CT
- Education: Howard University, Washington, DC Hunter College, New York, NY Columbia University, New York, NY

Louise E. Jefferson (1908–2002) was an American artist.

== Education ==
After attending public schools in Washington DC, Jefferson began her artistic education taking lessons at Howard University before moving to New York City in 1935. She attended Hunter College, which in the first half of the 20th century had the third highest enrollment of African American women in United States colleges and universities that were not dedicated solely to African American Studies. While there, she studied art composition, design, and lithography. From Hunter, Jefferson moved on to study graphic arts and printing practices at Columbia University.

== Artistic career ==
Following her studies at Columbia University, Jefferson began her artistic career designing posters for the YWCA (Young Women's Christian Association) in New York City, and found freelance work for Friendship Press. By 1942, she was the publishing company's artistic director, overseeing all aspects of its book productions. She was the first African American to hold a director's position in the publishing industry. Jefferson additionally did freelance work for the major publishing companies Doubleday, Macmillan, and Viking, as well as the academic presses of Columbia University, Oxford University, Rutgers University, and Syracuse University. Jefferson designed illustrations of black and white children for the songbook We Sing America. In 1936, then governor of Georgia, Eugene Talmadge, ordered copies of the songbook burned. Her lithographs were exhibited in museums around the country under the auspices of the Harmon Foundation, an organization known for supporting and exhibiting the works of African Americans from the 1920s until the 1960s.

In 1960, Jefferson retired from Friendship Press. She would, however, continue to produce work, designing book jacket covers and maps for universities and publishing companies, as well as publicity materials for the 23rd and 26th annual National Urban League Beaux Art Balls, held respectively in 1963 and 1966 at The Waldorf Astoria hotel. Following her retirement, Jefferson embarked on five trips to Africa, where she documented her travels in both illustration and photography. In 1974, The Decorative Arts of Africa was published, which documents her research, photographs, and drawings of her visits to Cameroon, the Democratic Republic of the Congo, Egypt, Gambia, Ghana, Guinea, Liberia, Mali, Niger, Nigeria, Senegal, South Africa, Sudan, Uganda, and Zimbabwe; it contains over three hundred of her illustrations. Jefferson kept an art studio in Litchfield, CT during her later years.

== Cartography ==
While Jefferson was well known as an artist and graphic designer, she created a series of maps between 1930-1940. While working for The Friendship Press, she produced a series of illustrated maps intended for both children and young adult readers. During this time, the maps that Jefferson created highlighted racial disparities, social injustices, and intolerances in the United States. Her maps serve as a powerful combination of visual literacy, vibrant artistic creativity, and also serve as a valuable informative resource readers of the time.

=== Maps ===
- Jefferson, Louise E. Twentieth Century Americans of Negro Lineage, First Edition. The Friendship Press, New York. 1965.
- Jefferson, Louise E. Africa: A Friendship Map. The Friendship Press, New York. 1945.
- Jefferson, Louise E. Indians of the United States of America. The Friendship Press, New York. 1944.
- Jefferson, Louise E. Uprooted people of the U.S.A. The Friendship Press, New York. 1945.
- Jefferson, Louise E. China: A Friendship Map The Friendship Press, New York. 1948.

== Personal life ==
Louise E. Jefferson was born in Washington, DC as an only child to parents Louise and Paul Jefferson. Her father, a calligrapher for the United States Treasury Department, encouraged her to draw as a child. She studied art in New York City, where she was active in the African American art scene in Harlem being credited as a founding member of the Harlem Artists Guild. Other notable members of the guild included Augusta Savage, Aaron Douglas, Selma Burke, Gwendolyn Bennett, and Jacob Lawrence. Jefferson was friends with poet and author Langston Hughes, and shared an apartment with civil rights activist Pauli Murray. Jefferson struggled financially in her early New York years before earning a full-time position at Friendship Press, the publishing branch of the National Council of Churches. After Jefferson's retirement from Friendship Press in 1960, she made several trips to Africa, eventually publishing her book The Decorative Arts of Africa in 1974. Jefferson's later years were spent in Litchfield, Connecticut, where she occupied the last few years of her life gardening and entertaining friends. She died in Litchfield in 2002, at the age of 93.

== Selected works and collections ==
=== The Amistad Research Center Collection ===
In 2002 the estate of Louise E. Jefferson was gifted to The Amistad Research Center, which is an open research facility in New Orleans, Louisiana dedicated to the records of African Americans and other underrepresented communities. The collection includes a myriad of Jefferson's works, including drawings and designs, a vast collection of photography and negatives, and other ephemera. Also in the research center's collection are Jefferson's financial records, appointment diaries, correspondence, notes and notebooks, and a book proposal and rough draft for an unpublished book, Art and Religion in Africa.

=== Lithographs ===
- Dancing at the Club Savoy, 1938, Metropolitan Museum of Art
- Nightclub Singer, 1938, Metropolitan Museum of Art
