= Harlem Artists Guild =

Organization for African-American artists

The Harlem Artists Guild (1935–1941) was an African-American organization founded by artists including Augusta Savage, Charles Alston, Elba Lightfoot, Louise E. Jefferson and historian Arthur Schomburg. Its goals included, encouraging young talent, providing a forum for the discussion of the visual arts in the community, fostering understanding between artists and the public through education towards an appreciation of art, focusing on issues of general concern to Black artists such as racism, poverty and unemployment, and cooperating with agencies to improve conditions and raise standards of living and achievement among African-American artists. It is said to have had its origins in the dissatisfaction of African-American artists with the activities of the Harmon Foundation, and was described by co-founder Alston as "a pressure group to get more black artists on the federal projects." The Guild laid the foundation for later civil rights-era cultural movements by promoting self-representation and group activism in addition to fostering creative growth.

== History ==
Formed in early 1935 by artists including Augusta Savage, Charles Alston and Elba Lightfoot, the Harlem Artists Guild (HAG) had headquarters on 136th Street, New York. HAG strategies included pressurizing the Federal Arts Project of the Works Progress Administration to accept more African-American participants. Racial exclusion and the necessity for a structured support network for Black artists during the Great Depression led to the founding of the Guild. The constitution on the Guild stated in part: "We, the artists of Harlem, being aware of the need to act collectively in the solution of the cultural, economic, social and professional problems that confront us, do hereby constitute ourselves an organization that shall be known as the Harlem Artists Guild." Members included Romare Bearden, Gwendolyn Bennett, Aaron Douglas, Norman Lewis, and some others; by 1937 the membership had grown to about 90 and the Guild was putting on exhibitions that included Jacob Lawrence.

From discussions among HAG artists about the necessity for, and ways to bring about, the establishment of a permanent art center for Harlem came the idea for the Harlem Community Art Center, which opened at the end of 1937, and of which Gwendolyn Bennett was Director from 1938 to 1941. The Harlem Artists Guild began holding its meetings at the center and held shows by members. The center provided free education in painting, drawing, sculpting, and design, and evolved into a venue for artistic training, community development, and cultural preservation.
