= Joseph Delaney (artist) =

American painter (1904–1991)

- Born: 1904; Knoxville, Tennessee, U.S.
- Died: 1991 (aged 86–87); Knoxville, Tennessee, U.S.
- Education: Art Students League of New York
- Movement: Harlem Renaissance, Works Progress Administration
- Relatives: Beauford Delaney (brother)

Joseph Delaney (1904 – November 21, 1991) was a black American artist who became a part of the New York art scene at the time of the Harlem Renaissance. He received a fellowship from the Rosenwald Foundation.

== Early life and education ==
Delaney was born in Knoxville, Tennessee, one of ten children of a Methodist minister. He was the younger brother of Beauford Delaney, with whom he shared an interest in drawing. Delaney dropped out of school in ninth grade. In his late teens and early 20s, Delaney spent a period of years without a settled home before joining the Eighth Infantry Regiment, Illinois National Guard.

In 1930, Delaney moved to New York City, where he enrolled in the Art Students League of New York. At the Art Students League he studied with Alexander Brook, figure drawing with George Bridgman, and human anatomy under Thomas Hart Benton. Delaney experimented with the expressive line. Delaney later cited Benton as a major influence, saying: "Benton will be with me always". During his free time, Delaney sketched the people and places around him.

== Career ==
During the Great Depression, he was employed by the Works Progress Administration (WPA). He taught children's art classes, drew renderings of silver by Paul Revere, and in 1943 Delaney was named to the WPA’s prestigious Easel Painting Division. Around the time that the WPA ceased to operate, Delaney was awarded a grant from the Julius Rosenwald Fund. From the summer of 1942 until January 1943, he used the grant to travel the eastern seaboard and create a series that documented the lives of black laborers. In 1978 and 1979, he worked as a painter as part of the Cultural Council Foundation CETA Artists Project in New York City.

Delaney lived and worked in New York until 1986, showing his work in New York's Washington Square for decades.

In 1986, he returned to Knoxville to become an artist-in-residence at the University of Tennessee, a position he held until his death in 1991.

Throughout his life, Delaney was committed to opposing racial discrimination, and his work reveals a "deep concern for the lives of common people."

== Legacy ==
The Art Institute of Chicago, the Knoxville Museum of Art, the Museum of the City of New York, the Indianapolis Museum of Art, the David Owsley Museum of Art, the National Gallery of Art, and the Smithsonian American Art Museum are among the museums holding works by Joseph Delaney. In 1968, he published a pamphlet that summarized his experience as an artist in New York, entitled Thirty-six Years Exhibiting in the Washington Square Outdoor Art Show.

== Exhibitions ==
Year	Title	Institution
1931	Washington Square Outdoor Art Show	Washington Square, NYC
1940	American Negro Exposition	Chicago, IL
1941	McMillen, Inc. Galleries	New York City
1942	Atlanta University	Atlanta, GA
1944	Greenwich House	New York City
1967	City College of New York	New York City
1986	Joseph Delaney: Retrospective Exhibition	University of Tennessee
2004	Life in the City: The Art of Joseph Delaney	University of Tennessee - Downtown Gallery
2018	Face to Face: Joseph Delaney	University of Tennessee - Downtown Gallery
2021	Beauford & Joseph Delaney: Lives in Art	University of Tennessee - Downtown Gallery
