= Elba Lightfoot =

American painter (1906–1989)

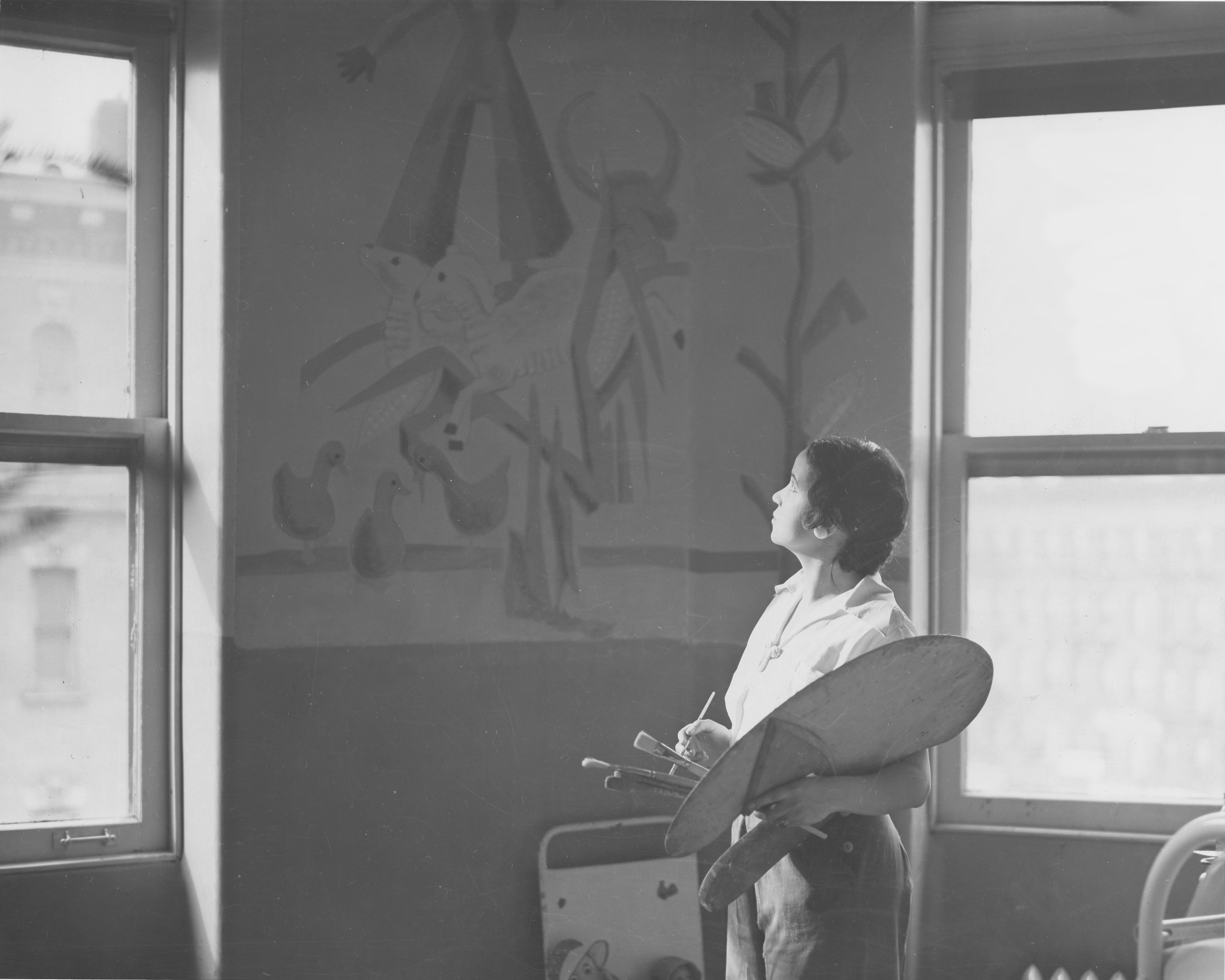
- Elba Lightfoot working on Mother Goose Rhymes, 1938 WPA mural at Harlem Hospital, New York, NY. From the collection of the Archives of American Art.
- Born: Elba Ansaloise Lightfoot; 1906; Evanston, Illinois
- Died: 1989
- Known for: Muralist
- Notable work: Federal Art Project murals at Harlem Hospital

Elba Lightfoot (1906–1989) was an African-American artist known for her work on the Works Progress Administration (WPA) murals at Harlem Hospital.

== Early life and education ==
Elba Ansoloise Lightfoot was born in Evanston, Illinois to Isaac Lightfoot and Carrie Jones. She grew up in Evanston and lived there until at least 1930. She was educated at Northwestern University in Evanston and Art Students' League in New York. In 1936, she married Nicaraguan immigrant Alberto Reyes in New York. She was sometimes known as Elba DeReyes or Reyes after her marriage.

== Harlem Artists Guild ==
In 1935, together with Charles Alston, Augusta Savage (who had experienced discrimination in her artistic career), others artists and bibliophile Arthur Schomburg, Lightfoot founded the Harlem Artists Guild to work towards equality in WPA art programs in New York. In 1936, a group of African American artists, including Charles Alston, Georgette Seabrook, Vertis Hayes, Sara Murrell, Selma Day, and Lightfoot submitted mural designs for Harlem Hospital in New York City. The murals were approved by the WPA's Federal Art Project (FPA), but the hospital superintendent, L.T. Dermody, initially rejected four of the designs.

Lightfoot was among the artists who took part in the Exhibition of the Art of the American Negro (1851–1940) (July 4 – September 2, 1940), connected with the American Negro Exposition at the Tanner Art Galleries in Chicago. She also featured in American Negro Art, 19th and 20th Centuries (December 9, 1941 – January 3, 1942) at New York's Downtown Gallery, the first exhibition of African-American art to have been held at a mainstream commercial gallery; curated by Edith Halpert, owner of the gallery. The exhibition counted among its sponsors such prominent white patrons as Mayor Fiorello La Guardia, Archibald MacLeish, A. Philip Randolph, and Eleanor Roosevelt.

Elba Lightfoot appears in a group photograph of the artists of the WPA Art Center at 306 W. 141st St., New York.

== Later life ==
A 1988 oral history interview of Elba Lightfoot is in the Camille Billops and James V. Hatch Archives at Emory University.

A gravestone with her name at Trinity Church in Manhattan indicates that she died in 1989. A postcard sent out in 1990 in celebration of Lightfoot's life is held in the Schomburg Center for Research in Black Culture collections.
