= American Totem =

1960 painting by Norman Lewis

American Totem is a 1960 oil on canvas black and white painting by Norman Lewis (1909–1979). Acquired by the Whitney Museum in 2018, it is the first work by Lewis to have entered the institution's permanent collection. It was included in The Whitney's Collection: Selections from 1900 to 1965 which ran from June 28, 2019 to May 1, 2025.

The work was executed as part of a group of black-and-white paintings by Lewis which examine the effects of the American civil rights movement. The "Totem" articulated in the work is a Ku Klux Klan hood.
