= Ford Mustang (fifth generation) =

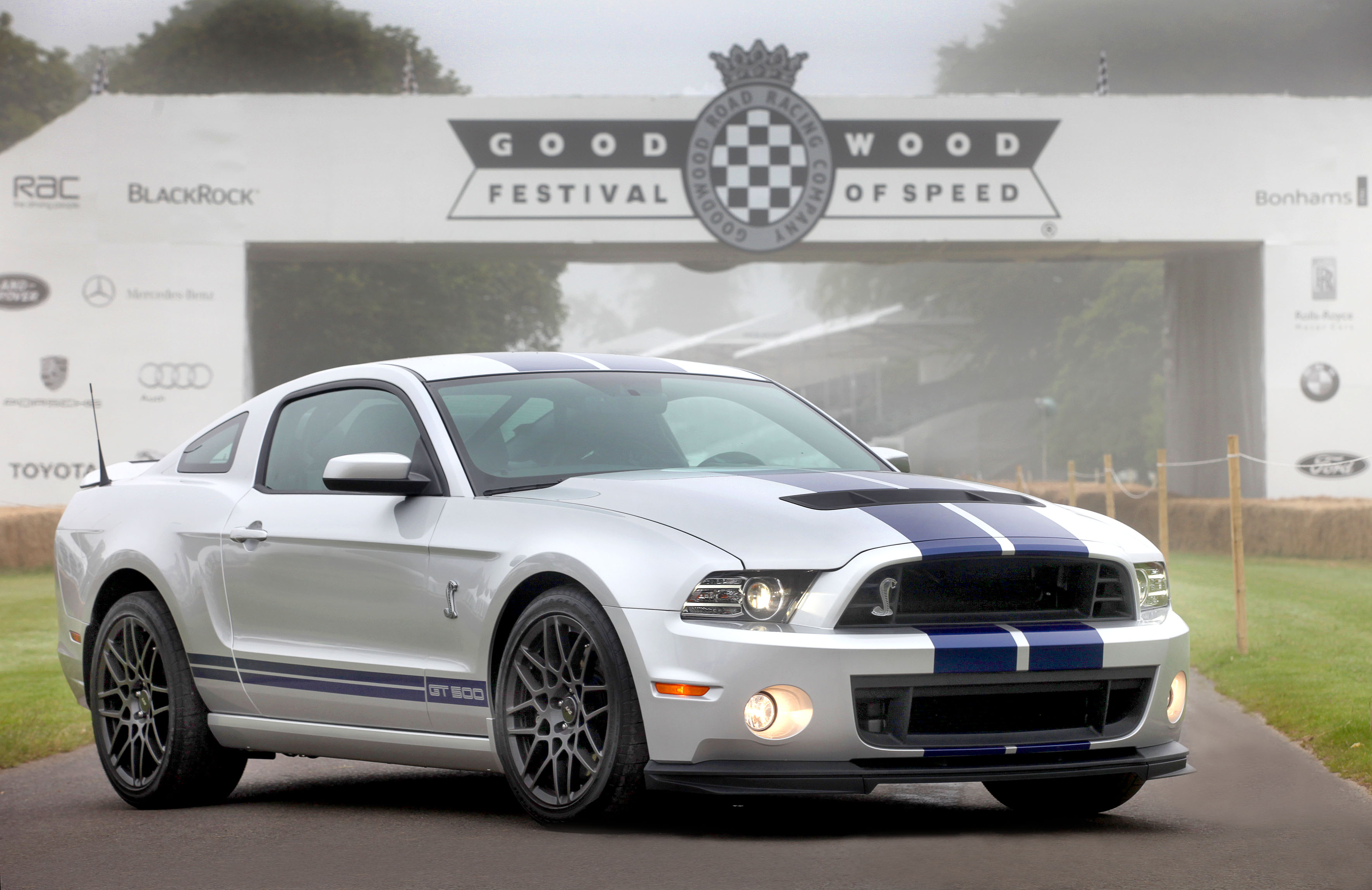
- Ford Shelby Mustang GT500

Overview
- Manufacturer: Ford Motor Company
- Model code: S197
- Production: September 2004 – June 2014
- Model years: 2005–2014
- Assembly: United States: Flat Rock, Michigan (Flat Rock Assembly Plant)
- Designer: Sid Ramnarace (2001, 2002)

Body and chassis
- Class: Pony car
- Body style: 2-door convertible; 2-door Coupe
- Layout: Front-engine, rear-wheel-drive
- Platform: Ford D2C platform

Chronology
- Predecessor: Ford Mustang (fourth generation)
- Successor: Ford Mustang (sixth generation)

The fifth-generation Ford Mustang, is a two-door four-seater pony car manufactured and marketed by Ford Motor Company from 2004 to 2014, for the 2005 to 2014 model years — carrying the internal designation S197 and marketed in coupe and convertible body styles. Assembly took place at the Flat Rock Assembly Plant in Flat Rock, Michigan. The fifth-generation began with the 2005 model year, and received a facelift in 2009 for the 2010 model year.

Originally designed by Sid Ramnarace through late 2001 and finalized in mid-2002, the fifth-generation Mustang's design was previewed by two pre-production concept cars that debuted at the 2003 North American International Auto Show. Development on the S197 program began in 1999 under chief engineer Hau Thai-Tang, shortly after the 1998 launch of "New Edge" (SN95) facelift. From the second half of 1999, design work commenced under Ford design chief J Mays, and concluded in July 2002 with the design freeze. There have been several variants of the fifth-generation Ford Mustang that include the Mustang GT/California Special, Shelby Mustang, Bullitt Mustang, and Boss 302 Mustang.

== Pre-production concepts ==
=== 2003 Ford Mustang GT Concept, 2003 Mustang Convertible Concept ===
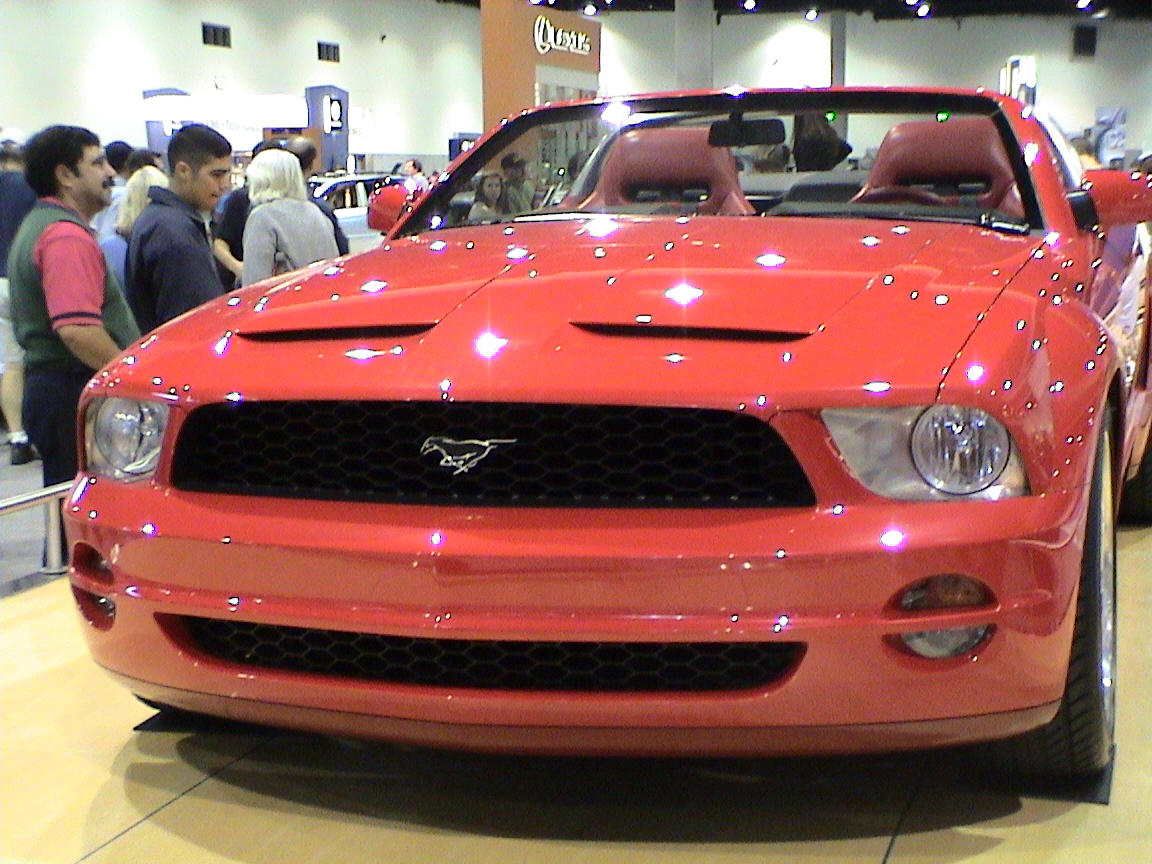
The fifth-generation Mustang Convertible Concept, which resembles the later Shelby GT500

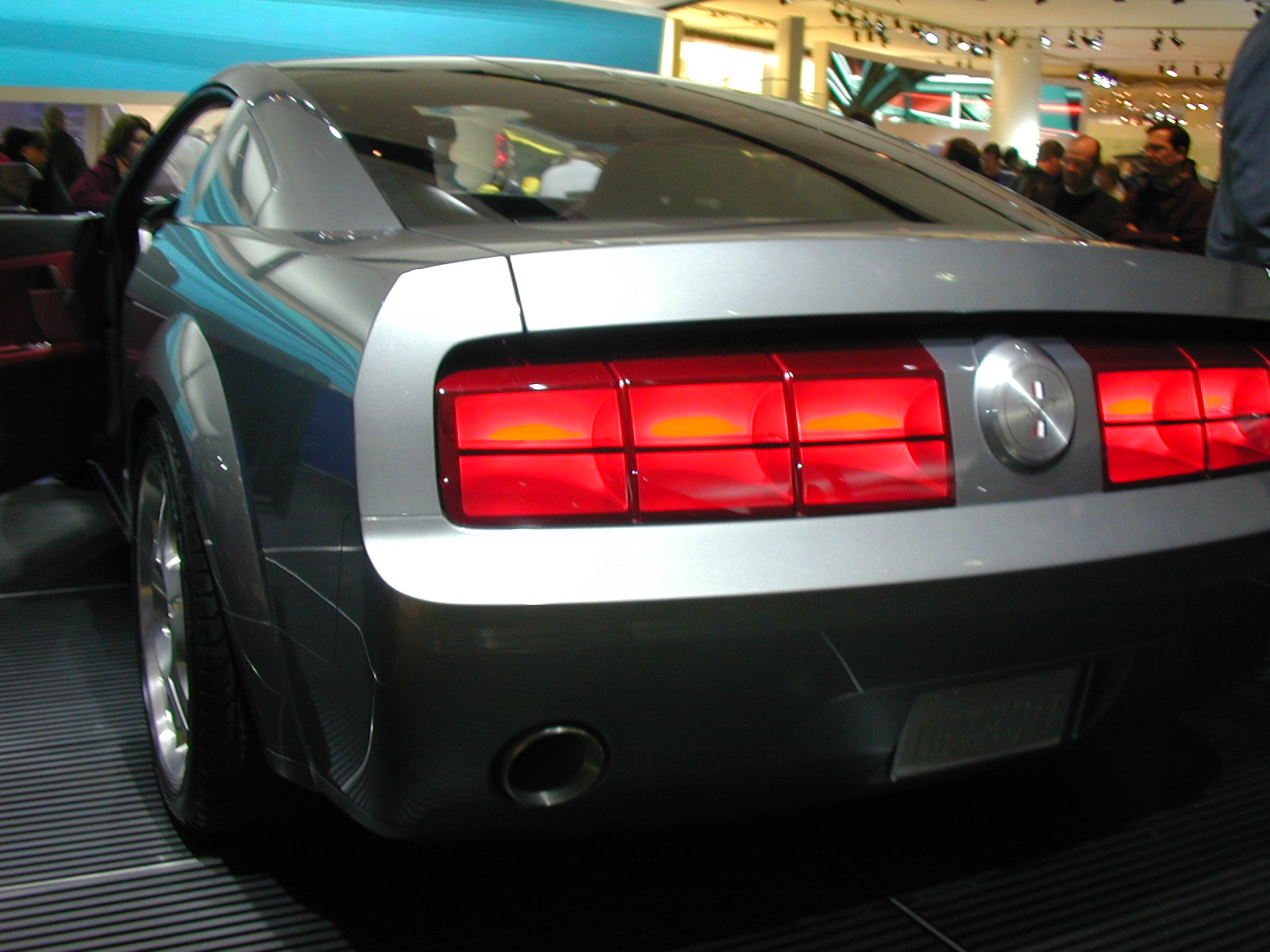
2003 Mustang GT Concept (rear view)

Developed between February and November 2002, two pre-production concept cars, a convertible and coupe model, were presented by Ford at the 2003 North American International Auto Show on January 5, 2003.

The Redline Red Metallic Ford Mustang GT convertible concept included a "showbar" with a rim of billet-aluminum trim, 20-inch wheels, 13.8-in cross-drilled Brembo brakes, red and charcoal leather upholstery with perforated surfaces on the seat backs, billet-aluminum shifter for the 5-speed automatic transmission, as well as 4-point racing-style seatbelts and instrument gauges.

The Tungsten Silver Ford Mustang GT coupe concept included a glass roof and functional hood scoops, as well as a red and charcoal leather interior accented by billet-aluminum hardware and a supercharged MOD 4.6 L engine rated at 400 hp (298 kW; 406 PS).

Appearing with other concept vehicles at the show such as the Cadillac Sixteen, Aston Martin V8 Vantage, and Dodge Tomahawk, AutoWeek called the Mustang concept the "most significant vehicle in show".

Both vehicles were eventually sold at the 2009 Barrett-Jackson Palm Beach auction for $175,000 (~$254,872 in 2025) each (before buyer premium).

=== S197 concept ===
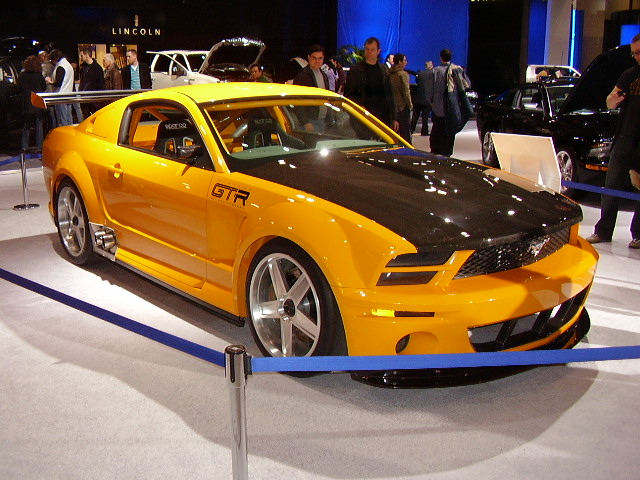
2004 Mustang GT-R Concept

At the following year's North American International Auto Show, Ford introduced a redesigned Mustang previewed by the 2003 concept vehicle that was code-named "S197." It was based on the Ford D2C platform. Developed under the direction of Chief Engineer Hau Thai-Tang and with exterior design done by Sid Ramnarace, the fifth generation Mustang drew inspiration from the first-generation 1964–1970 Mustang. The design aesthetic of J Mays, Ford's Senior Vice President of Design, has been described as "retro-futurism."

== Initial release ==
=== Mustang ===
2005–2009 Mustang (S197)
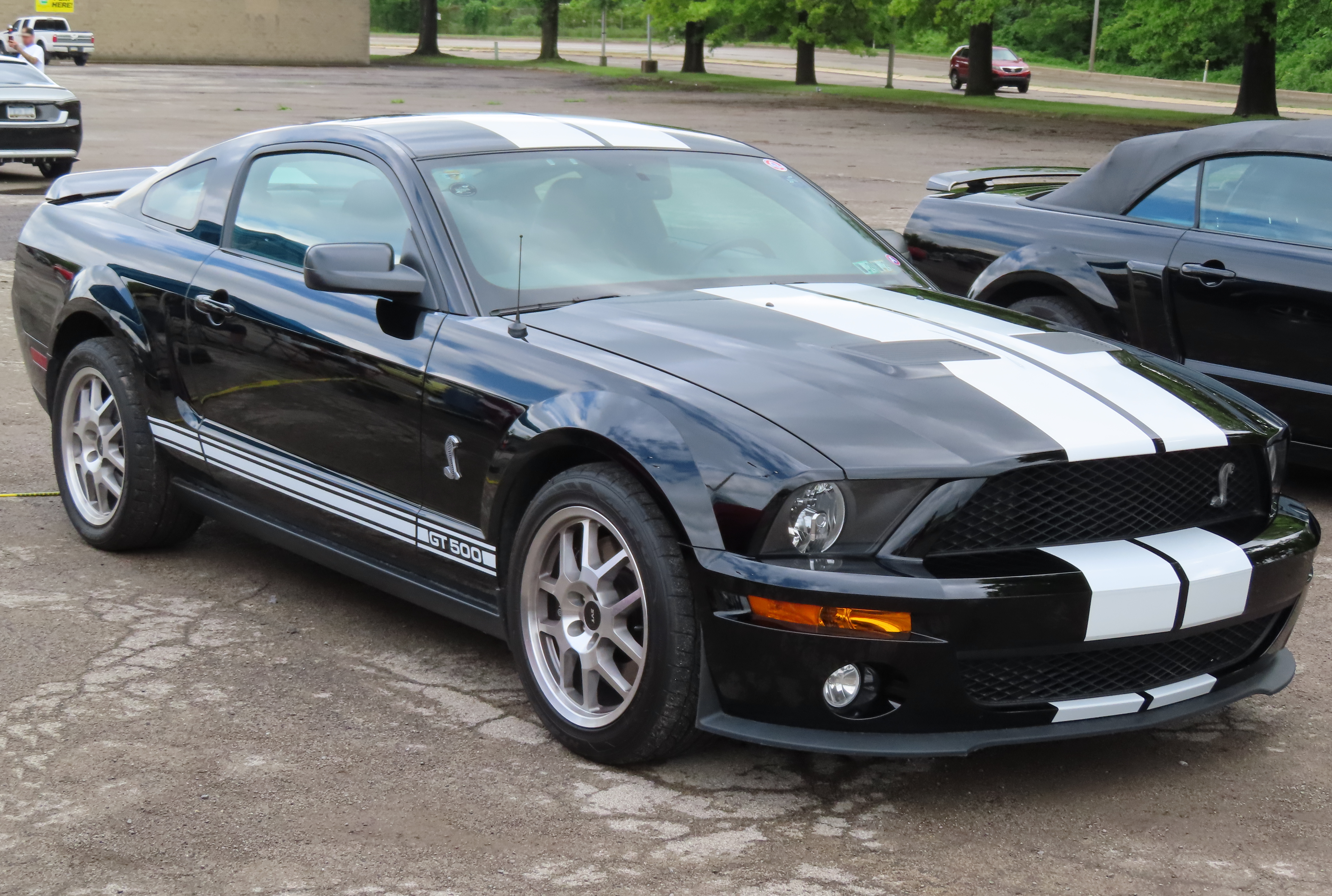
- 2008 Ford Mustang Shelby GT500

Overview
- Production: September 2004 – December 2008
- Model years: 2005–2009
- Designer: Larry Erickson (design chief 2001–2004); Sid Ramnarace (S197 exterior: 2001); Kevin George (S197 interior: 2001); Doug Gaffka (Bullitt: 2006)

Powertrain
- Engine: 4.0 L (245 cu in) Cologne V6; 4.6 L (281 cu in) Modular V8; 5.4 L (330 cu in) Modular supercharged V8
- Transmission: 5-speed manual (Borg-Warner T-5, Tremec TR-3650); 6-speed manual (Tremec TR-6060); 5-speed automatic (Ford 5R55S)

Dimensions
- Wheelbase: 107.1 in (2,720 mm)
- Length: 187.6 in (4,770 mm)
- Width: 73.8 in (1,870 mm)
- Height: 54.5 in (1,380 mm)
- Curb weight: V6 coupe MT/AT: 3,350–3,420 lb (1,520–1,551 kg); V6 convertible MT/AT: 3,475–3,555 lb (1,576–1,613 kg); V8 coupe MT/AT: 3,480–3,525 lb (1,579–1,599 kg); V8 convertible MT/AT: 3,610–3,655 lb (1,637–1,658 kg); GT500 coupe: 3,950 lb (1,792 kg); GT500 convertible: 4,040 lb (1,833 kg)

Chronology
- Predecessor: 1999–2004 Mustang (SN95 II)
- Successor: 2010–2014 Mustang (S197 II)

Production start-up for the 2005 Mustang was on September 7, 2004, with the first 2005 model rolling off the Flat Rock assembly line on September 27, 2004. U.S. market launch and customer deliveries began at the end of October 2004, with production ending in late 2008 for the 2009 model.

The 2005–2009 base Mustang was powered by Ford's cast-iron block 4.0 L Cologne SOHC V6 engine, replacing the 3.8 L Essex OHV V6 used in 2004 and older models. It produced 210 hp (157 kW) at 5,300 rpm and 240 lb⋅ft (325 N⋅m) of torque at 3,500 rpm and was mated to a standard Tremec T-5 5-speed manual transmission with Ford's 5R55S 5-speed automatic transmission available as an option. A 3.31:1 final drive ratio was standard with either transmission. In a comparison test with a Pontiac G6 Convertible conducted by Motor Trend magazine, a Mustang V6 convertible equipped with an automatic transmission was able to accelerate from zero to 60 mph (97 km/h) in 7.3 seconds; 1.4 seconds quicker than the 2006 Pontiac G6 convertible.

The Mustang had a MacPherson strut front suspension with reverse "L" lower control arms. The rear suspension employed a new three-link system to locate the axle longitudinally, and a Panhard Rod to locate the axle laterally. This live axle rear suspension, while sacrificing handling, provides the benefits of reduced cost and weight over heavier, more expensive independent rear suspensions. In spite of this, Ford has drawn heavy criticism from the automotive journalism community for the decision to equip the fifth generation Mustang with the live axle system. At a press conference, Ford stated that an independent rear suspension would have added $5,000 to the showroom price of the car.

Standard equipment on the 2005 Mustang includes power windows, dual power mirrors, power door locks with remote keyless entry, dual front air bags, AM/FM stereo with CD player, 16-inch painted aluminum wheels, and larger disc brakes than the previous generation Mustang with twin-piston calipers in the front. Some of the options available included Ford's MyColor (a color-configurable instrument cluster available as part of the Interior Upgrade package), brushed aluminum panels (also part of the Interior Upgrade Package), Ford's Shaker 500 (500 watt peak output) or Shaker 1000 (1000 watt peak output) premium audio system with a 6-disc MP3-compatible CD changer, leather seating surfaces, a six-way power adjustable driver seat, and a four-channel anti-lock brake system with traction control (standard on GT models). All Mustang GT and Convertibles came with a rear sway bar with white links during these years; the bar diameter varied with options and was 18 mm, 19 mm, 20 mm, or 22.4 mm. Replacement links from Ford are colored black or oxide coated

For 2006, a less expensive version of the Mustang was introduced as the new base model. Slotted below the V6 Deluxe, the V6 Standard, starting at US$19,115 MSRP for a coupe, or US$23,940 MSRP for a convertible, the V6 Standard models were each $100 less expensive than their V6 Deluxe counterparts. The only difference between the V6 Standard and V6 Deluxe trim levels was that the V6 Standard featured 16-inch black steel wheels with plastic wheel covers, versus the 16-inch alloy wheels on the V6 Deluxe. However, 16-inch alloy wheels could still be optioned on the V6 Standard, as could most other available options on the V6 Deluxe. The V6 Standard was discontinued after the 2006 model year, once again leaving the V6 Deluxe as the base Mustang trim level.

All Mustangs for the 2008 model year have seats containing material derived from soy beans, harking back to some of Henry Ford's ideals.

Ford Sync was available on the 2009 model only as a dealer-installed kit.

Several new options and standard features were introduced in the following years, including the Pony Package (2006), a DVD-based GPS navigation system made by Pioneer (2007), a power passenger seat (2007), heated seats (2007), Sirius Satellite Radio (2007), new flat bottom spoiler for V6 only (2006), standard side airbags (2006), HID headlamps (2008), and ambient interior lighting (2006). The ambient interior lighting package consisted of the installation of electroluminescence that gave the driver the ability to choose various color combinations for the instrument cluster, sound system and climate control displays, as well as light emitting from the top of the front footwells and from beneath the rear seats.

For 2009, Ford introduced a new option called the glass roof. This option (US$1,995 at introduction) was in effect a full roof sunroof that splits the difference in price and purpose of the coupe and convertible models.

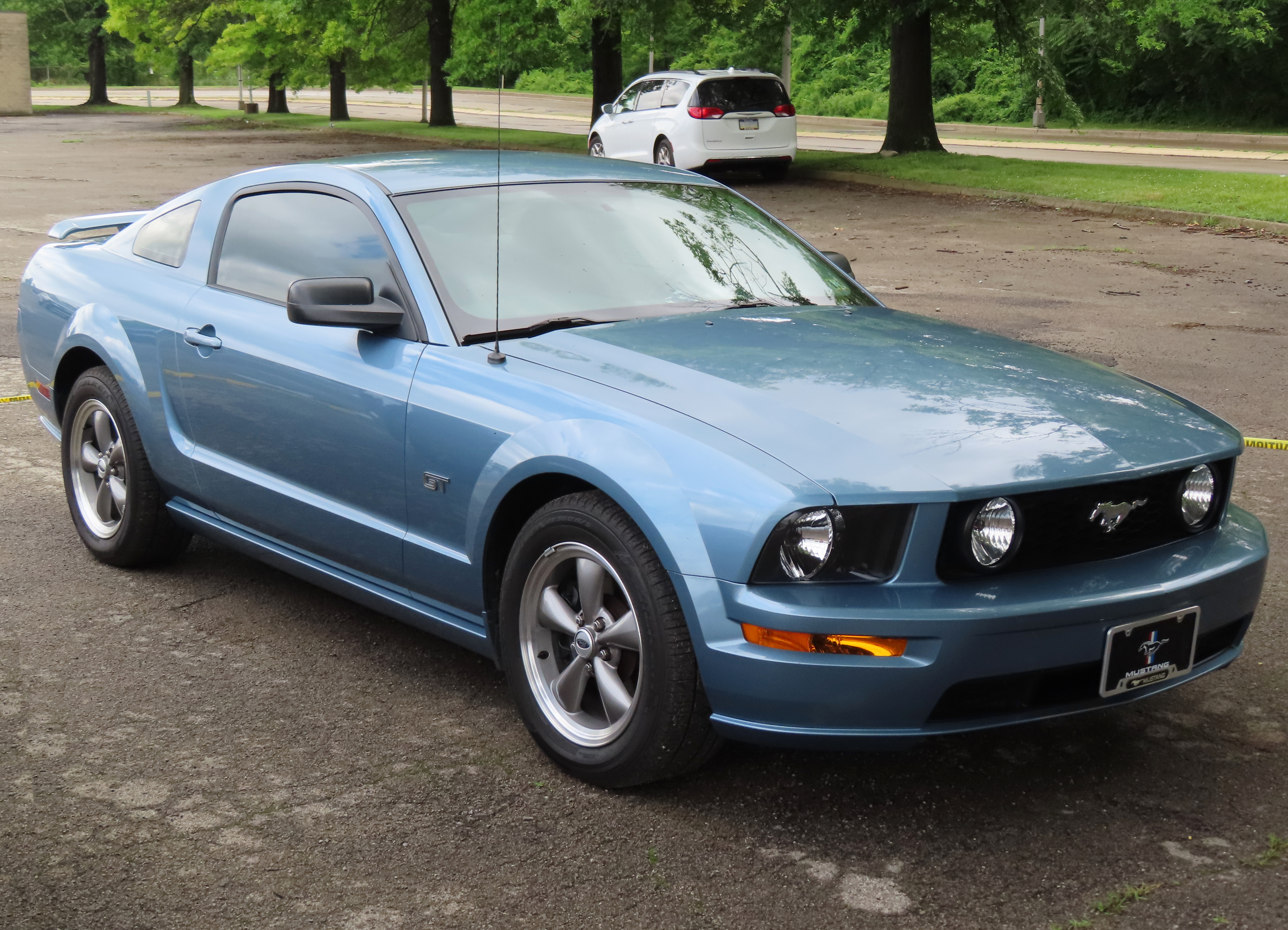
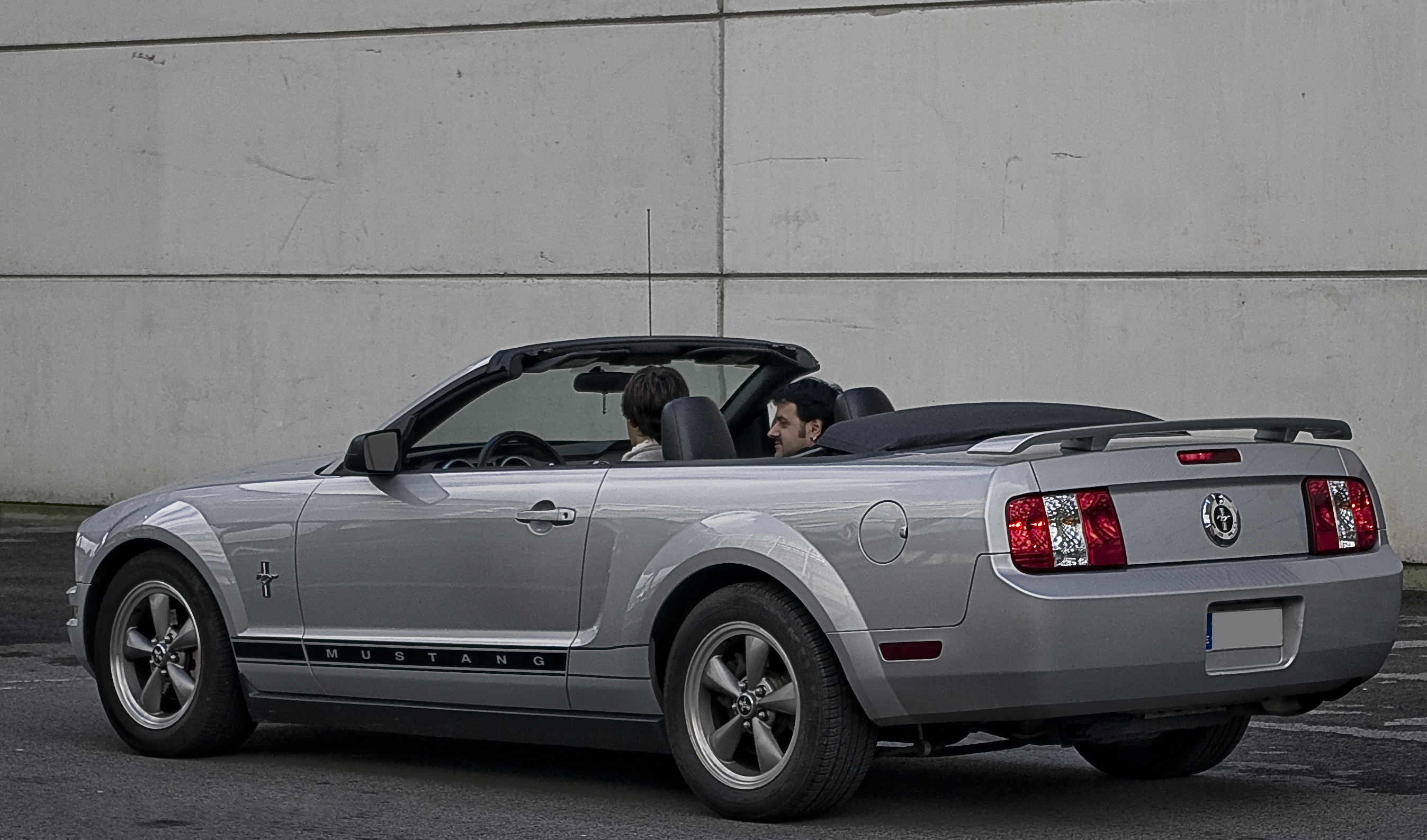
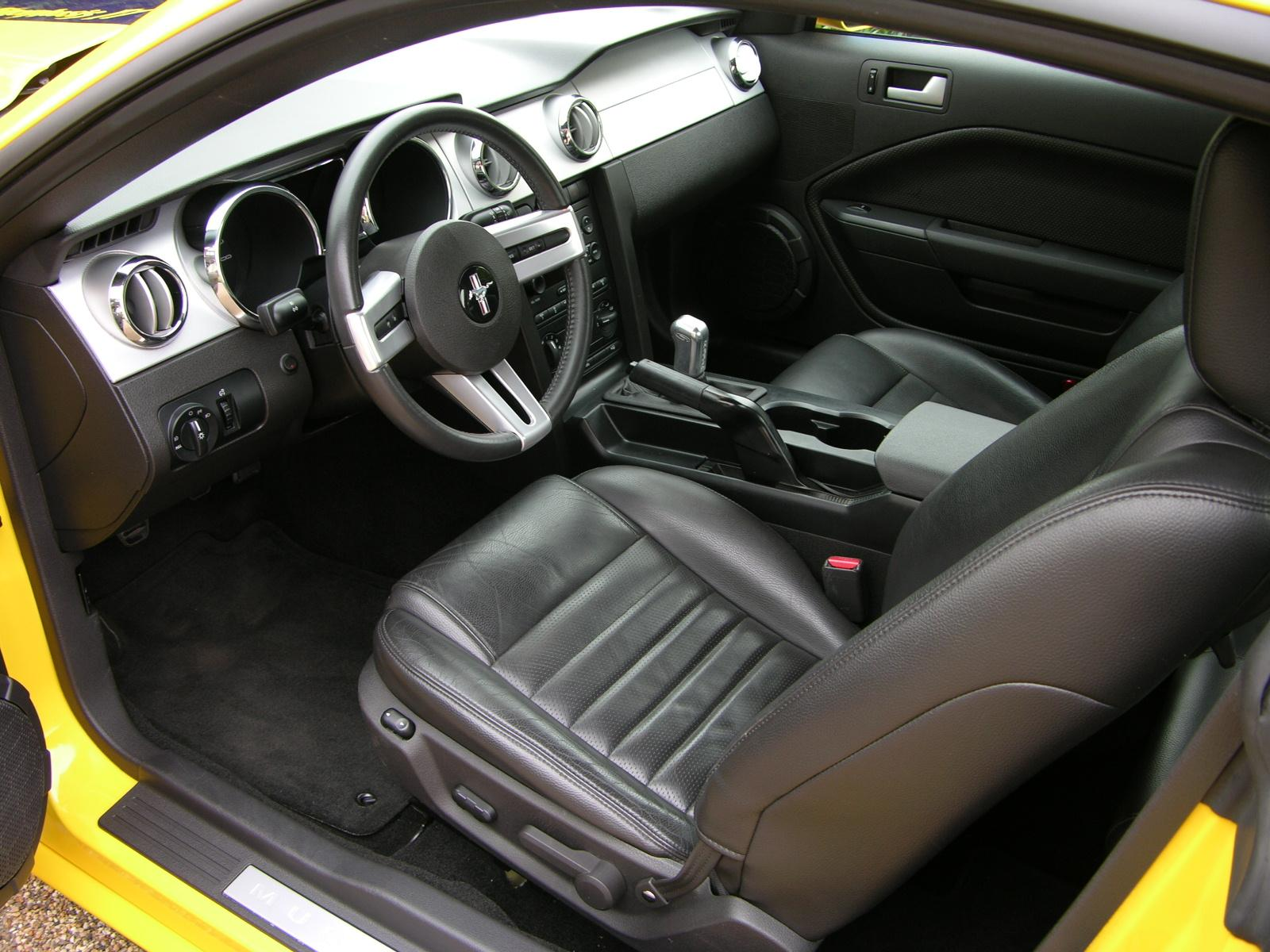
Images showing the design and interior of the S197 Mustang (2004–2008)

==== Pony Package ====
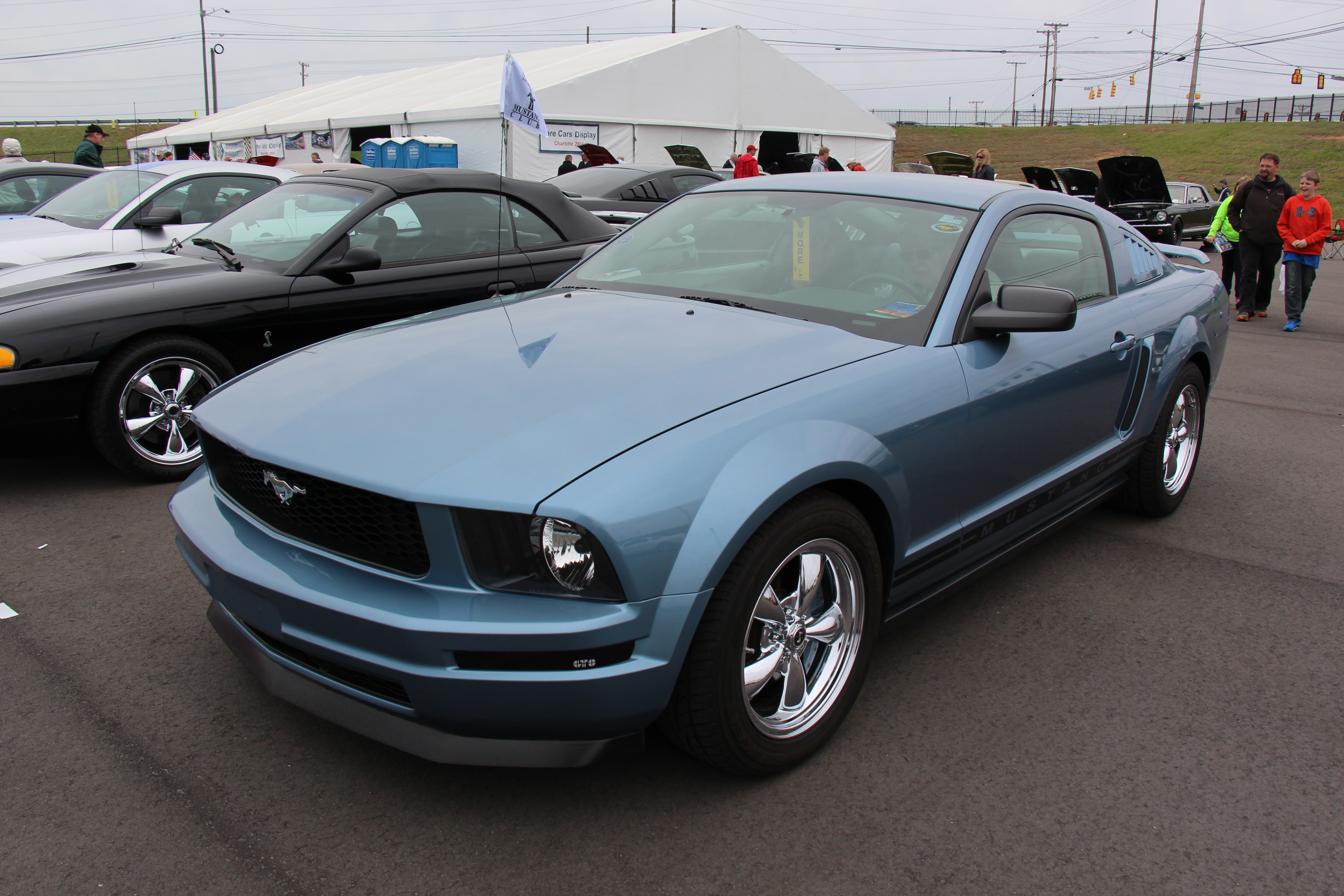
2005 Ford Mustang V6 coupe

The Pony Package for the V6 Mustang became available starting in 2006. This option includes an upgraded suspension derived from the Mustang GT, 17-inch wheels with wider tires (originally only available on the GT), a unique grille design with two options of fog lamps, a rear deck spoiler, and unique door striping and emblems. Later versions of the pony package also included a stainless-steel exhaust and power driver's seat.

==== V6 Appearance Package ====
At the 2007 SEMA Show in Las Vegas, Ford Custom Accessories introduced the V6 Appearance Package. Among the items were a billet grille, scoops, a spoiler and blackout trim treatments. Available in 2008 as a $2,398 option, it was promoted with an additional Power Pack FR1 (an 85 mm Cold Air Intake sourced from the Bullitt, True Dual exhaust with an X-pipe and Bullitt Mufflers, a Pro-Cal Hand held tuner and a Ford Racing Performance oil filter), handling package FR3 (shocks/struts, front and rear anti-rollbars, V6 lowering springs, and a V6 strut tower bar) and a short throw shifter. Available in 2008, the V6 Appearance Package was only available on the V6 Coupe with the Premium Package with either an automatic or manual transmission and only with Grabber Orange, Vapor Silver Metallic, and Dark Candy Apple Red. For 2009 the V6 Appearance Package was offered in Performance White and Black. By 2008, total of 152 V6 Appearance Packages were built and only 96 by 2009.

=== Mustang GT ===
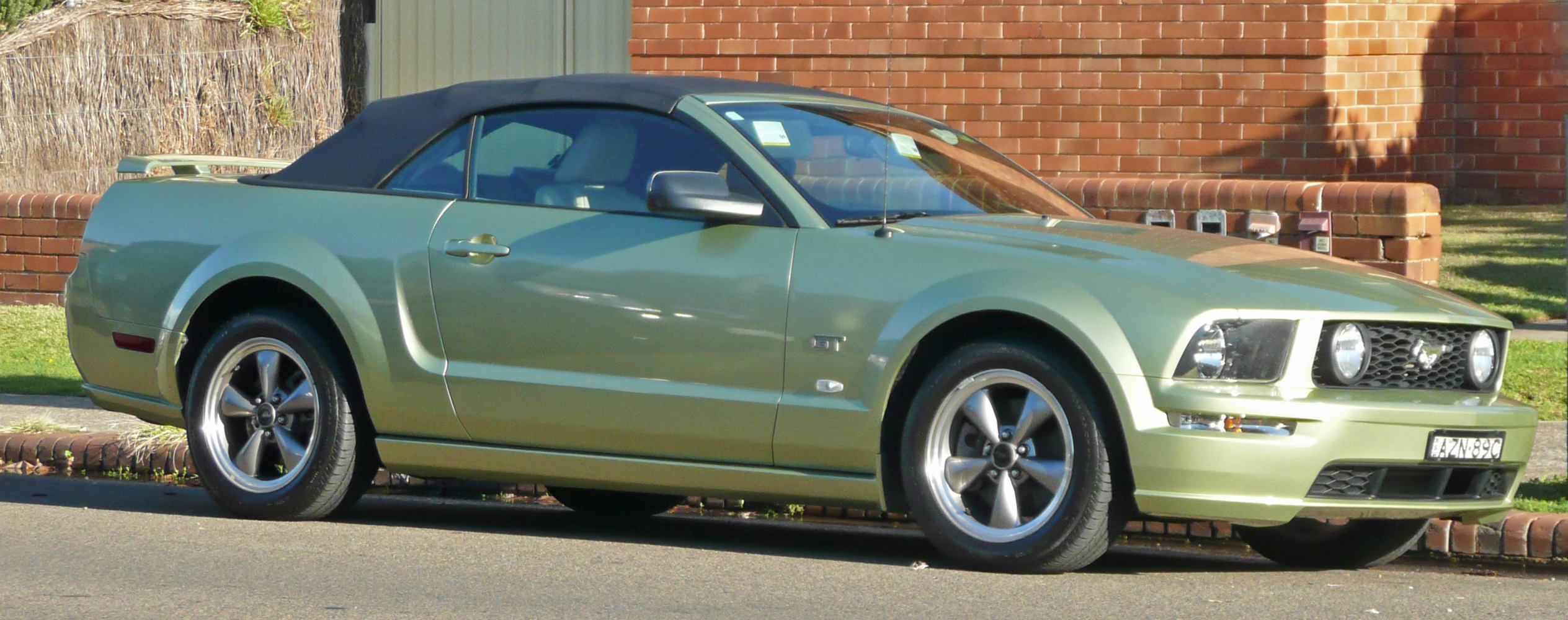
2005–2009 Ford Mustang GT convertible

The Mustang GT featured an all-aluminum 4.6 L 3-valve SOHC Modular V8 with variable camshaft timing and a more rugged Tremec TR-3650 transmission. The engine produces 300 hp (224 kW) at 5,750 rpm and 320 lb⋅ft (434 N⋅m) of torque at 4,500 rpm. The GT model was capable of performing a quarter-mile test in 13.7 seconds at 103 mph (166 km/h) with acceleration from 0 to 60 mph (97 km/h) in 4.9 seconds. The Mustang GT also came equipped with a limited-slip differential complete with the same carbon-fiber clutch discs used in the 2003 to 2004 SVT Cobra and the 2007 Shelby GT500. The differential uses the 31-spline axles and the 8.8 in (224 mm) ring gear. The standard final drive ratio of 2005 and 2006 Mustang GTs with a manual transmission was 3.55:1. Since the 2007 model year, a 3.31:1 ratio final drive was standard with the 3.55:1 gearing available as a factory installed option. Automatic transmission-equipped models of all years come with 3.31:1 ratio.

The Mustang GT features a stiffer, better handling version of the standard suspension, larger 12.4-inch front brake discs (versus the 11.4-inch discs used on V6 Mustangs), standard four-channel ABS with traction control, a two-piece drive shaft, a stainless steel dual exhaust, standard grille-mounted fog lights, and 17-inch wheels, with optional 18-inch wheels available starting with the 2006 model year.

==== Shelby GT and GT-H ====
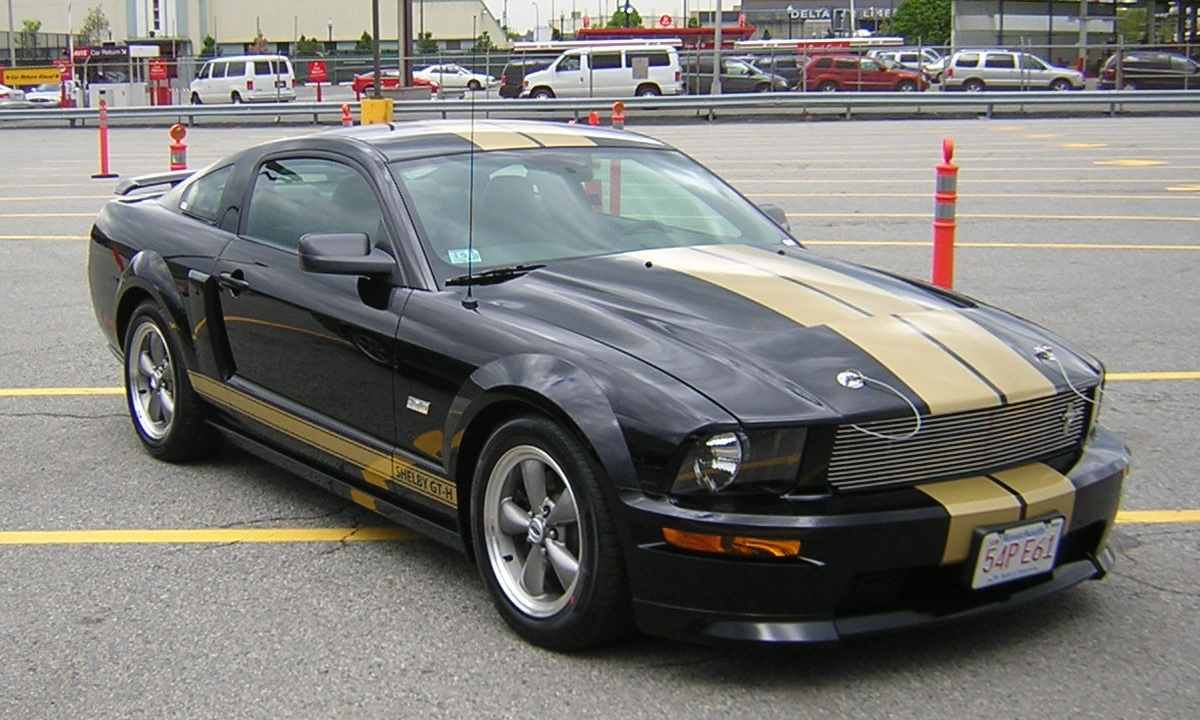
Ford Mustang Shelby GT-H

The 2006 Shelby GT-H and later Shelby GT were based on the standard GT model, but modified by Carroll Shelby Automobiles. The V8 engine in these models had a power output of 319 hp (238 kW) by means of a Ford Racing air intake, performance tune, and upgraded exhaust system.

The Shelby GT-H was a fleet vehicle for Hertz car rental outlets and traced its roots to the 1966 Shelby GT350H. The GT-H was available only in Hertz's corporate colors: black exterior and twin gold racing stripes. It included a billet aluminum grille, a Shelby hood with functional hood pins, as well as front and rear fascias that were later used on Shelby GT and GT/CS models. The GT-H came with the Power Pack that included a cold air intake, revised exhaust system and custom performance calibration, boosting power output to 319 hp (238 kW) and torque to 330 lb⋅ft (447 N⋅m). The GT-H also includes the handling package with lowering springs, improved dampers, sway bars, a strut tower brace and a 3.55:1 ratio rear axle assembly. A total of 500 units were ordered by Hertz for the 2006 model year, and 500 convertible models were announced for 2007.

==== GT California Special ====
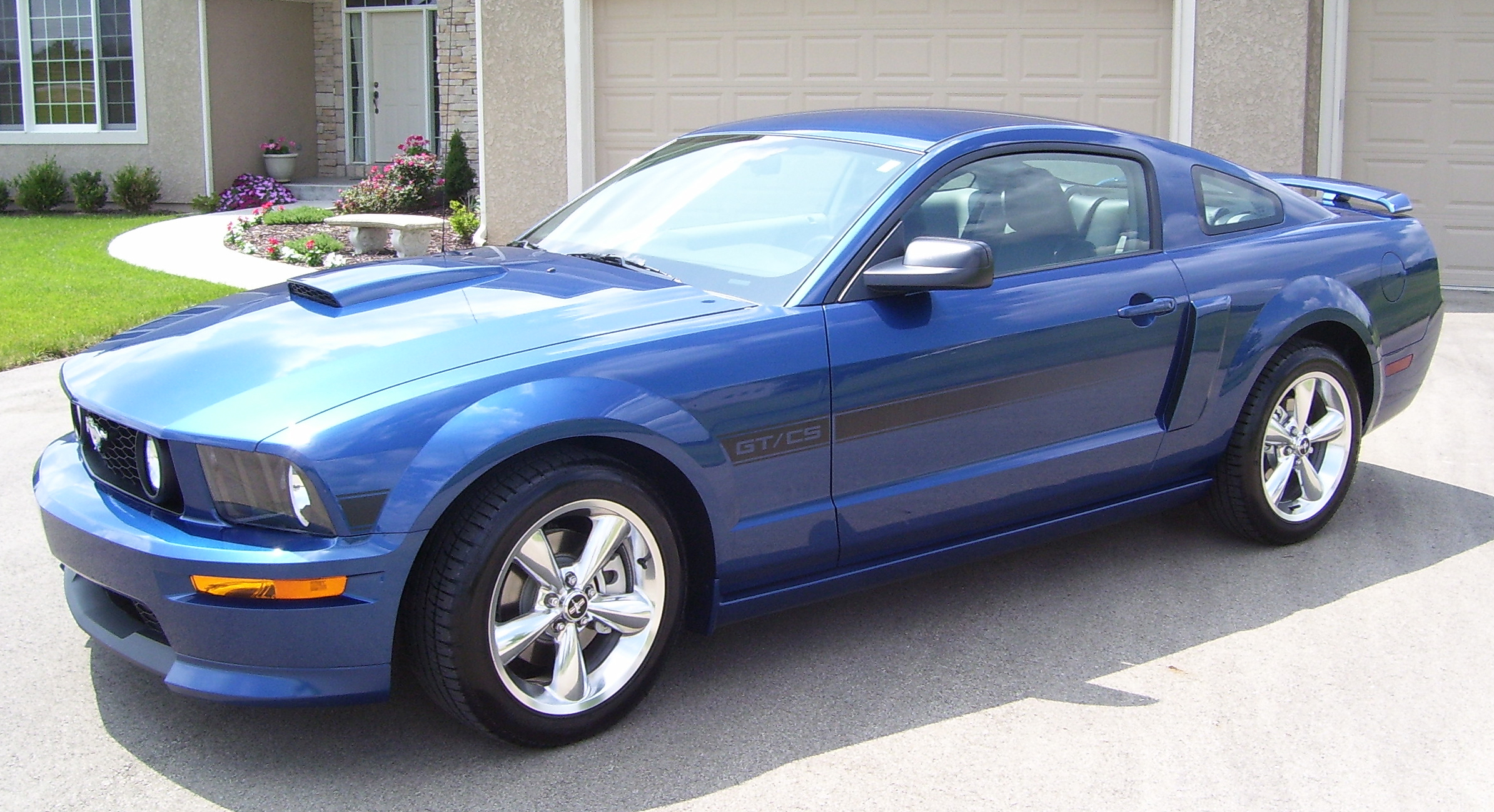
2007 Ford Mustang GT/CS

In 2006, Ford introduced the GT California Special (GT/CS) package, hearkening back to the original 1968 California Special Mustang. The package adds 18-inch polished aluminum wheels, non-functional side scoops, and unique vinyl striping that replaced the side GT emblems. The GT/CS also included a different front fascia and rear valance with diffuser, similar to those found on the Shelby GT. The GT/CS edition's front fascia was 1.5 in (38 mm) lower to the ground than the standard GT. Interior upgrades included Mustang labeled floor mats, and CS only leather interior color options. The 2007 GT Appearance Package adds a hood scoop, exhaust tips, and engine cover.

In 2010, the GT California Special was re-introduced as optional on the Mustang GT. Black GTCS side stripes which faded into a side scoop. The front fascia was replaced with the one used in the 2011 Boss 302 with working lower fascia fog lights. The rear diffuser was taken from the Shelby GT 500 while the rear deck lid featured black vinyl and a wing spoiler. Wheels were argent spoke 19 inch with a GT logo stamped towards the outer rim on each wheel. The interior's bright dash was replaced with black carbon fiber treatment, while carbon fiber door inserts and seat leather patterns were added. Badging included "GTCS" on the carbon fiber dash and floor mats. The front grille was brushed aluminum billet with a V6 style pony emblem on the driver's side. (for 2012, it was changed to black billet). Rear axle gear selections were 3.31, 3.55, or 3.73.

==== 2008–2009 Bullitt ====
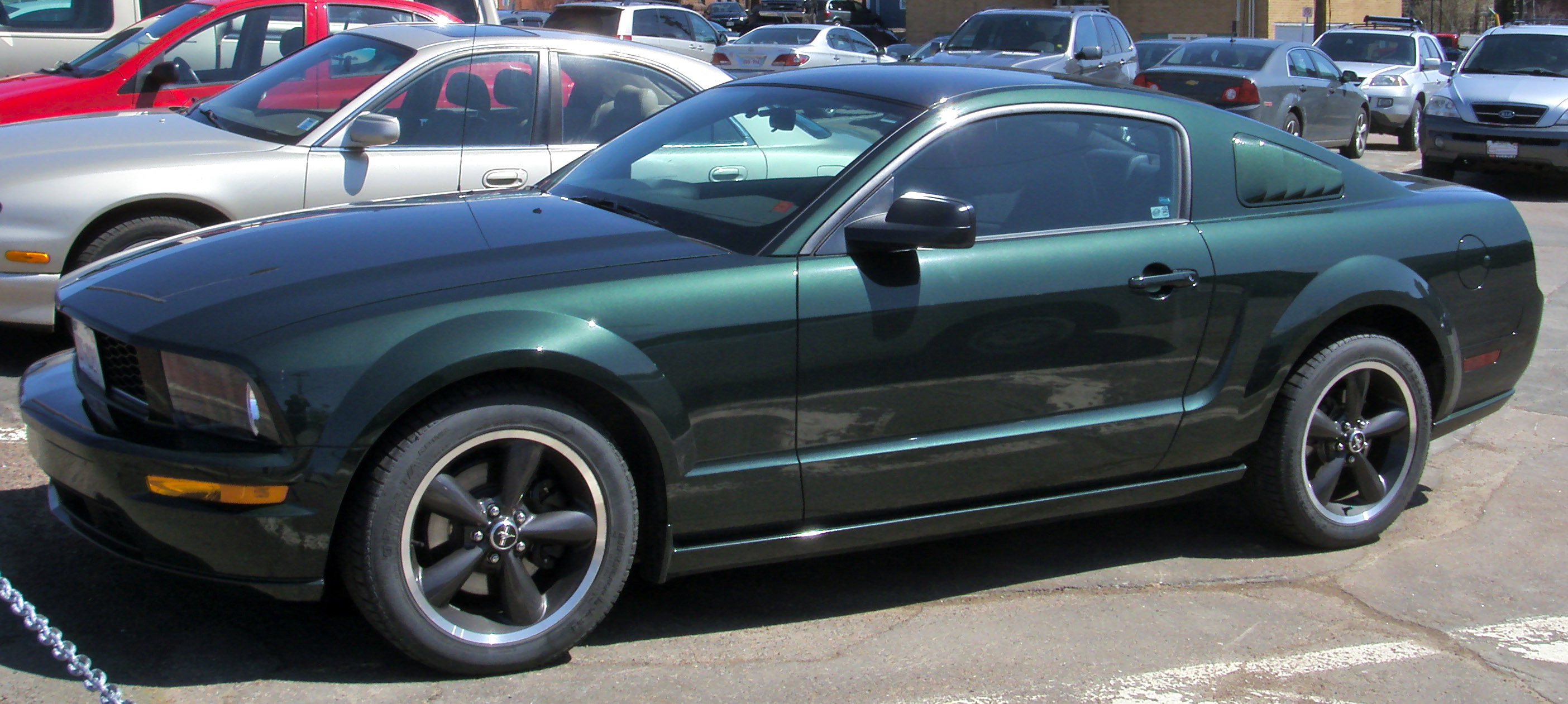
2008 Ford Mustang Bullitt

The Mustang Bullitt returned in February 2008 as a variant of the Mustang GT, the last version of which was produced in 2001. It is reminiscent of the Dark Highland Green GT-390 fastback Mustang driven by Steve McQueen in the 1968 film Bullitt. Available in Dark Highland Green or Black exterior paint without spoiler and GT fender emblems; the faux gas cap on the deck lid is replaced by a unique Bullitt version. The Mustang GT's standard fog light-equipped grille is replaced with a specially designed pony-less style grille highlighted by an aluminium accent. Dark Argent Gray 18-inch cast-aluminum euro-flange wheels are used with matching brake calipers and larger, 3.5 inch exhaust tips replace the Mustang GT's standard 3-inch tips. Although side (quarter) window louvers (as shown in picture) are not standard, they are added by owners because they are similar to those on the 1968 Mustang fastback.

The Bullitt uses a version of the Mustang GT's aluminum 4.6 L SOHC V8. It has a cold air intake, improved engine calibration, and a revised exhaust system designed to mimic the sound of the Mustang used in the Bullitt movie. Total power output is 315 hp (235 kW) at 6,000 rpm and 325 lb⋅ft (441 N⋅m) of torque at 4,250 rpm and the engine's redline has been raised to 6,500 rpm (from the standard Mustang GT's 6250 rpm). Premium grade, 91-octane or better gasoline was recommended to be used, although an adaptive spark ignition system allows the engine to accept regular grade gasoline. Total output is the same with either fuel, but the engine delivers a flatter torque curve when using premium. The Tremec TR-3650 5-speed manual transmission from the Mustang GT is used, but the Bullitt featured a heavier duty rear axle (also used in GT500KR) with 3.73:1 ratio, versus the Mustang GT's 3.31:1 or optional 3:55:1 ratios. The suspension is improved over the standard GT utilizing stiffer springs, struts, and a decorative front strut tower brace while also lowering the car's ride height by six millimeters. Most of the Mustang Bullitt's components are available in the aftermarket for retrofitting earlier S197 Mustang GT vehicles, but some parts used in Bullitt Mustangs are marked to show authenticity.

The 2009 Mustang catalog indicated that the Bullitt package was available on Mustang GT Premium coupes equipped with the manual transmission as a regular production option.

==== 45th Anniversary Edition (2009 GT) ====
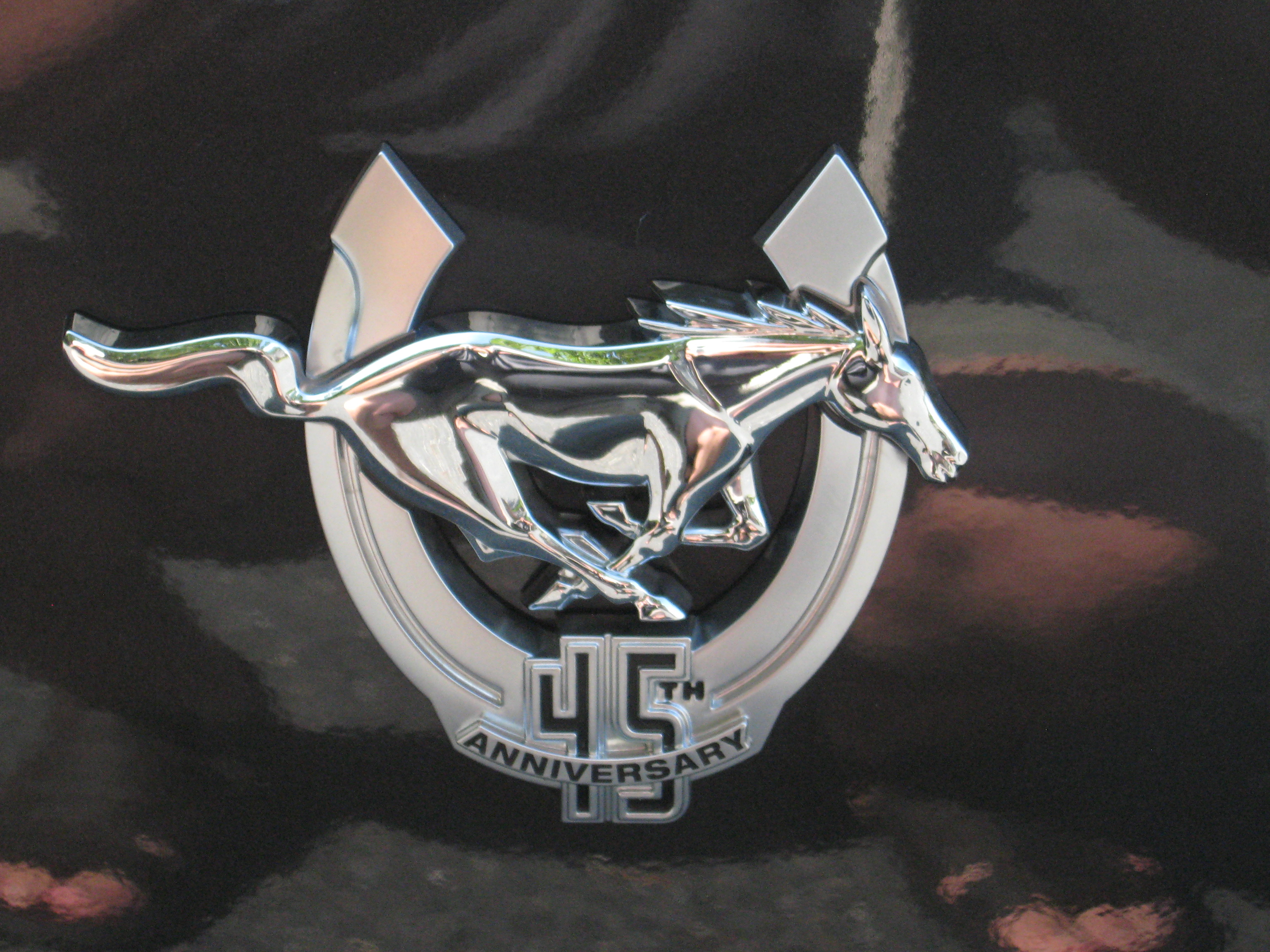
2009 Mustang GT 45th Anniversary Badge

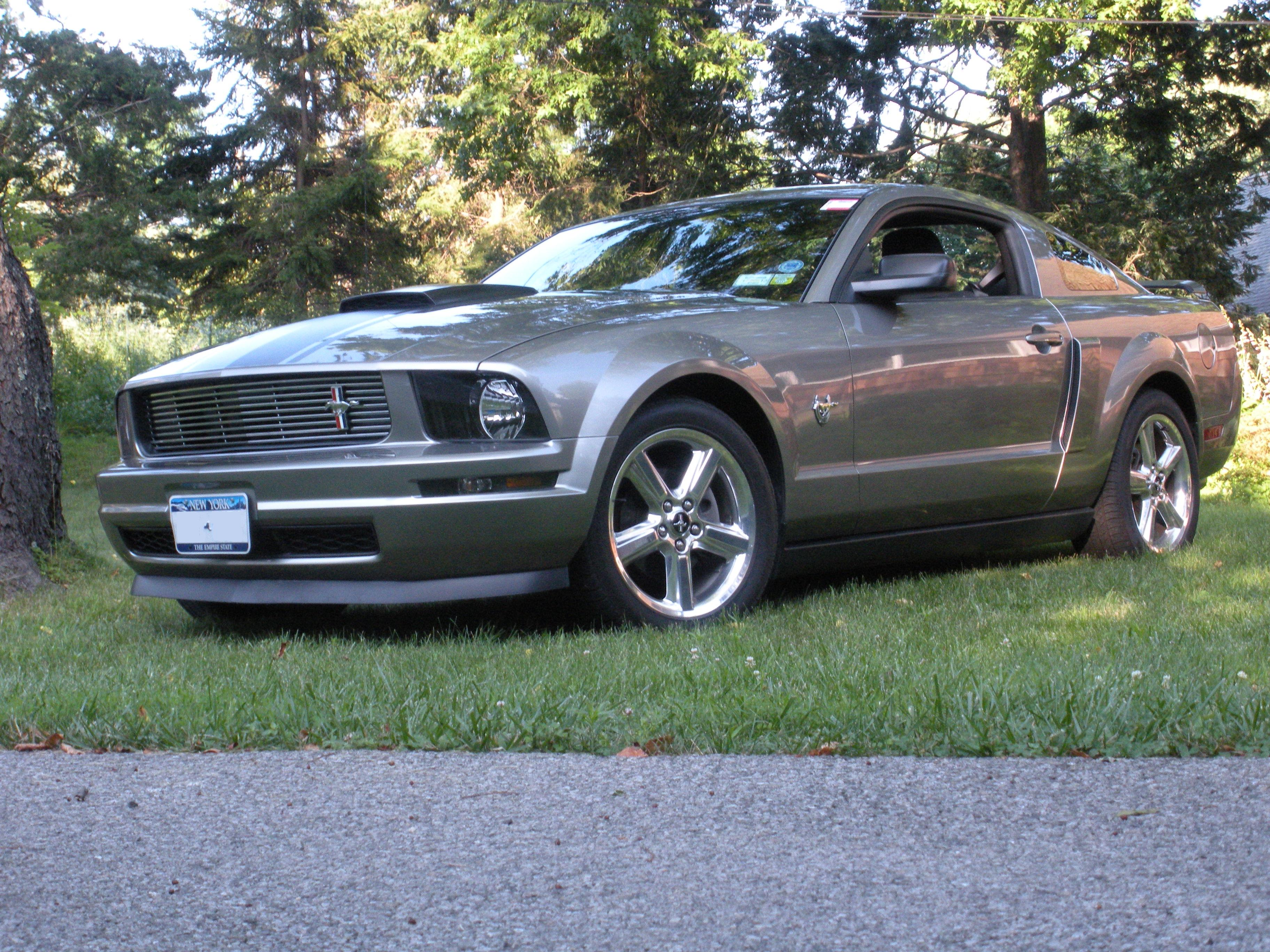
2009 Mustang GT 45th Anniversary Edition (with custom quarter window louvers)

Features of the 2009 Mustang include a glass top roof option, as well as special 45th Anniversary badging to commemorate the original Mustang's launch in 1964. A total of 46,420 were built. Satellite radio was standard on premium interior models, and Deluxe was no longer used to identify base models. This model has the same engine and functional equipment as a basic GT. The 2009 45th Anniversary edition is badged with a Mustang Colt emblem, with the 45th Anniversary logo. It included with an optional hood scoop and polished stainless steel exhaust tips package, rear spoiler, the Ambient Lighting package was now standard and included with the price of the vehicle at no additional cost, and 17-inch polished aluminum wheels were optional (17-inch wheels were standard but this model year used the same silver 5-spoke wheels since 2007).

==== Iacocca Silver 45th Anniversary Edition (2009½ GT) ====
The 2009 Iacocca Silver 45th Anniversary Edition was a 45 unit production run of cars also commemorating the 45th anniversary of Ford Mustang. Named after Lee Iacocca who helped develop and introduce the Mustang. It was designed by Michael Leone (I Legacy & Michael Leone Design) and built by California-based Gaffoglio Family Metalcrafters coachbuilding company. Despite its aftermarket build status, it carries factory engine and warranties. Iacocca was given car 1 of the 45. One was later auctioned for $352,000.

=== Shelby GT500 (2007–2009) ===
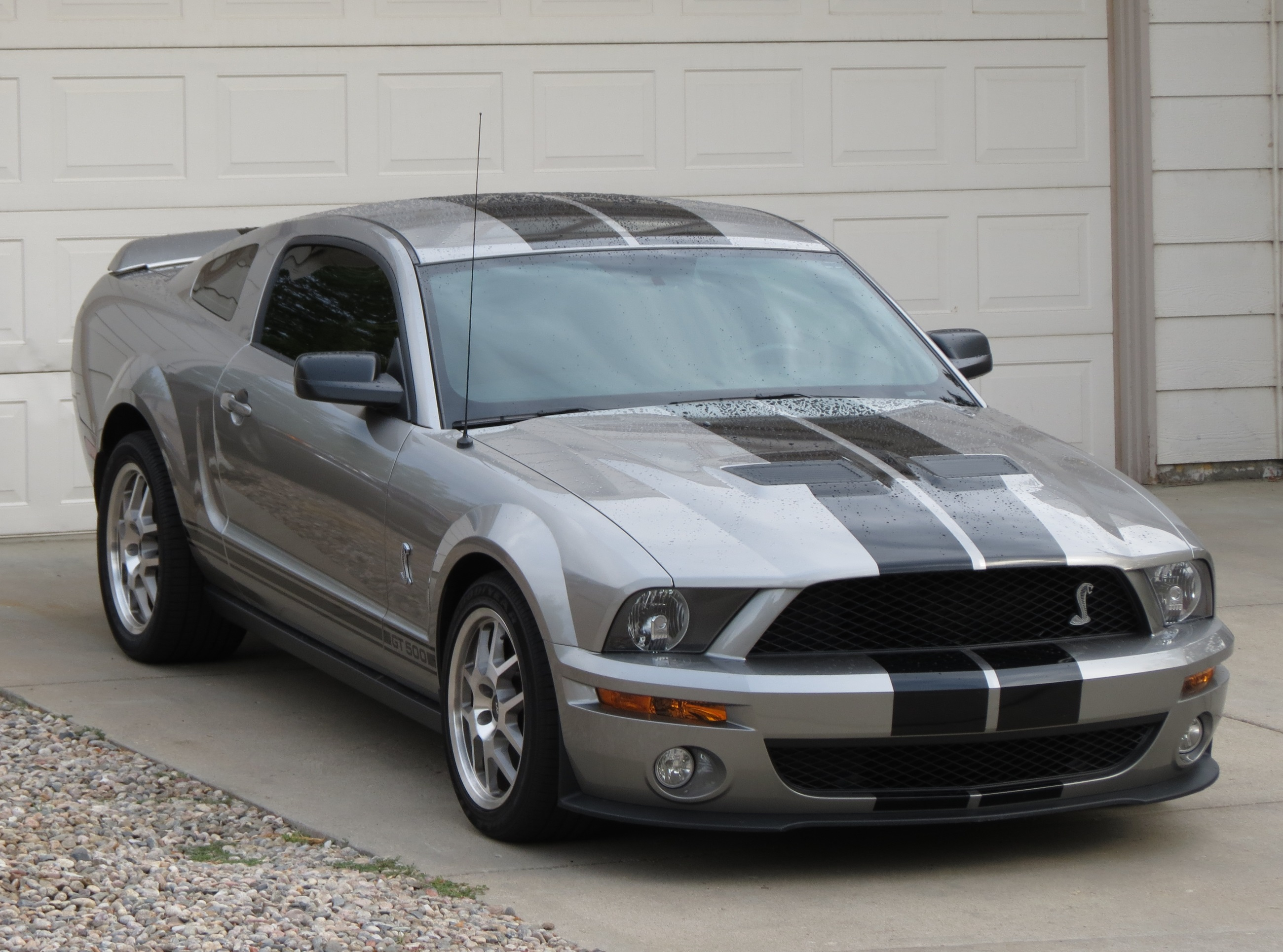
Shelby GT500

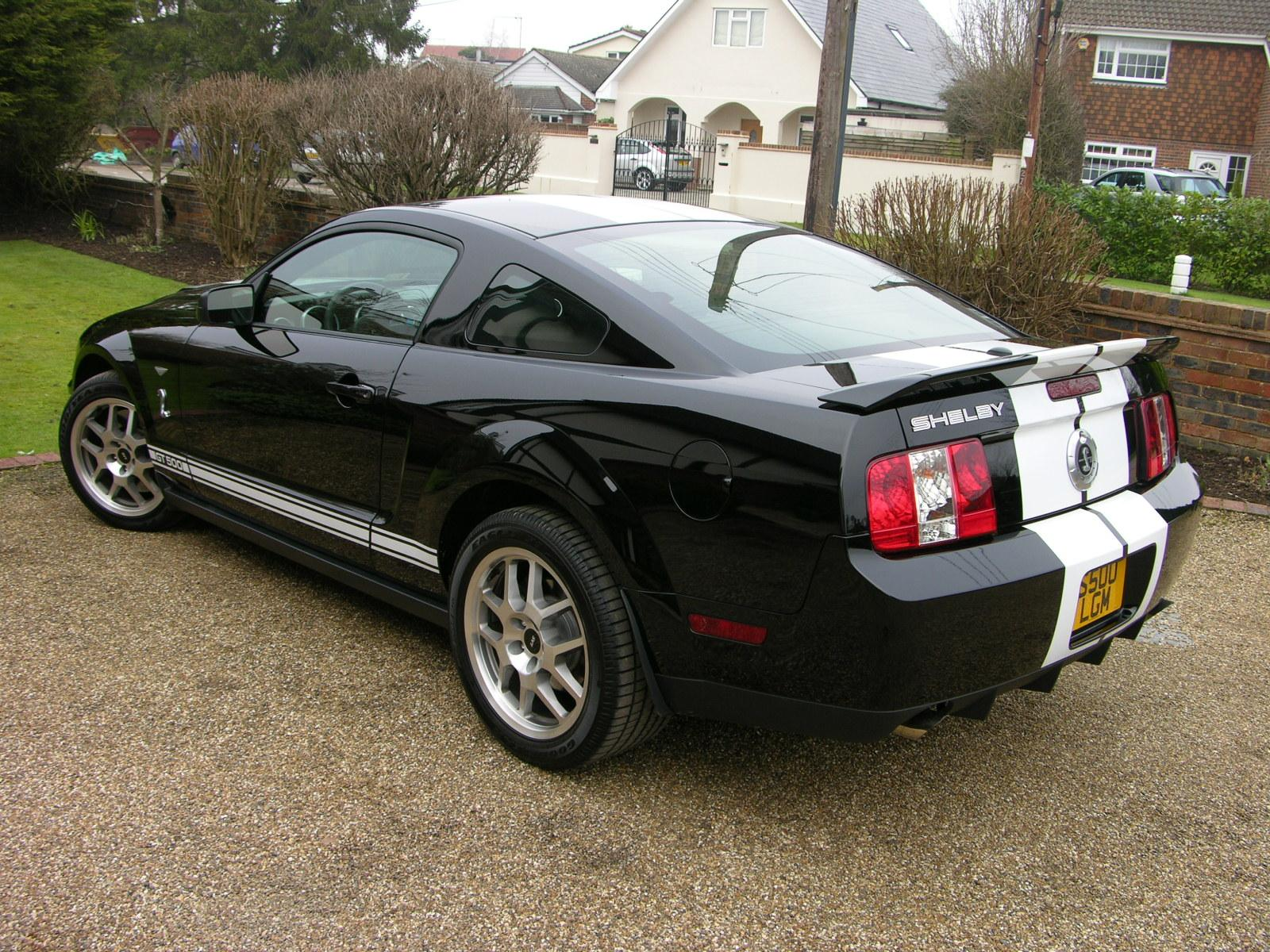
Shelby GT500 (with export modifications)

For 2007, Ford's SVT launched the Shelby GT500, a successor to the 2003/2004 Mustang SVT Cobra. The GT500 shared basic design characteristics with the Mustang V6 and GT. It retained the same basic live axle rear suspension setup of the Mustang V6 and GT, with minor durability enhancements such as thicker sheet metal supports and extra welds, as well as redesigned strut towers to accommodate a wider engine. The supercharged and intercooled Ford Modular 5,408 cc (330.0 cu in) DOHC 4 valves per cylinder V8 engine with an iron block and aluminum heads was rated at 500 hp (507 PS; 373 kW) at 6,000 rpm and 480 lb⋅ft (651 N⋅m) of torque at 4,500 rpm. The Tremec TR6060 6-speed manual transmission uses a 3.31:1 rear drive ratio. Wheels are 18×9.5 inch with P255/45ZR18 tires in the front and P285/40ZR18 tires in the rear. Brembo 14-inch disc brakes with aluminum four-piston calipers are on the front with 11.8-inch disc brakes with single-piston calipers in the rear.

The GT500 failed to meet some automotive journalists' expectations. Car and Driver magazine, for example, though praising the GT500 for its ample horsepower and relatively smooth ride, criticized their test car for its heavy weight and, in particular, the nose-heavy weight distribution of 57.7% front and 42.3% rear (compared to the 52.5% front, 47.5% rear of a Mustang GT manual they tested). Nevertheless, in spite of their opinion of its drawbacks, Car and Driver drove a GT500 in their 2007 "Lightning Lap" road test at Virginia International Raceway and found that the car's on-track performance lap time of 3:05.9 fell just short of the Porsche 911 Turbo (3:05.8) and faster than that of the Lotus Elise (3:09.3), Porsche Cayman S (3:09.5) and BMW M6 (3:10.0).

==== Shelby GT500KR ====
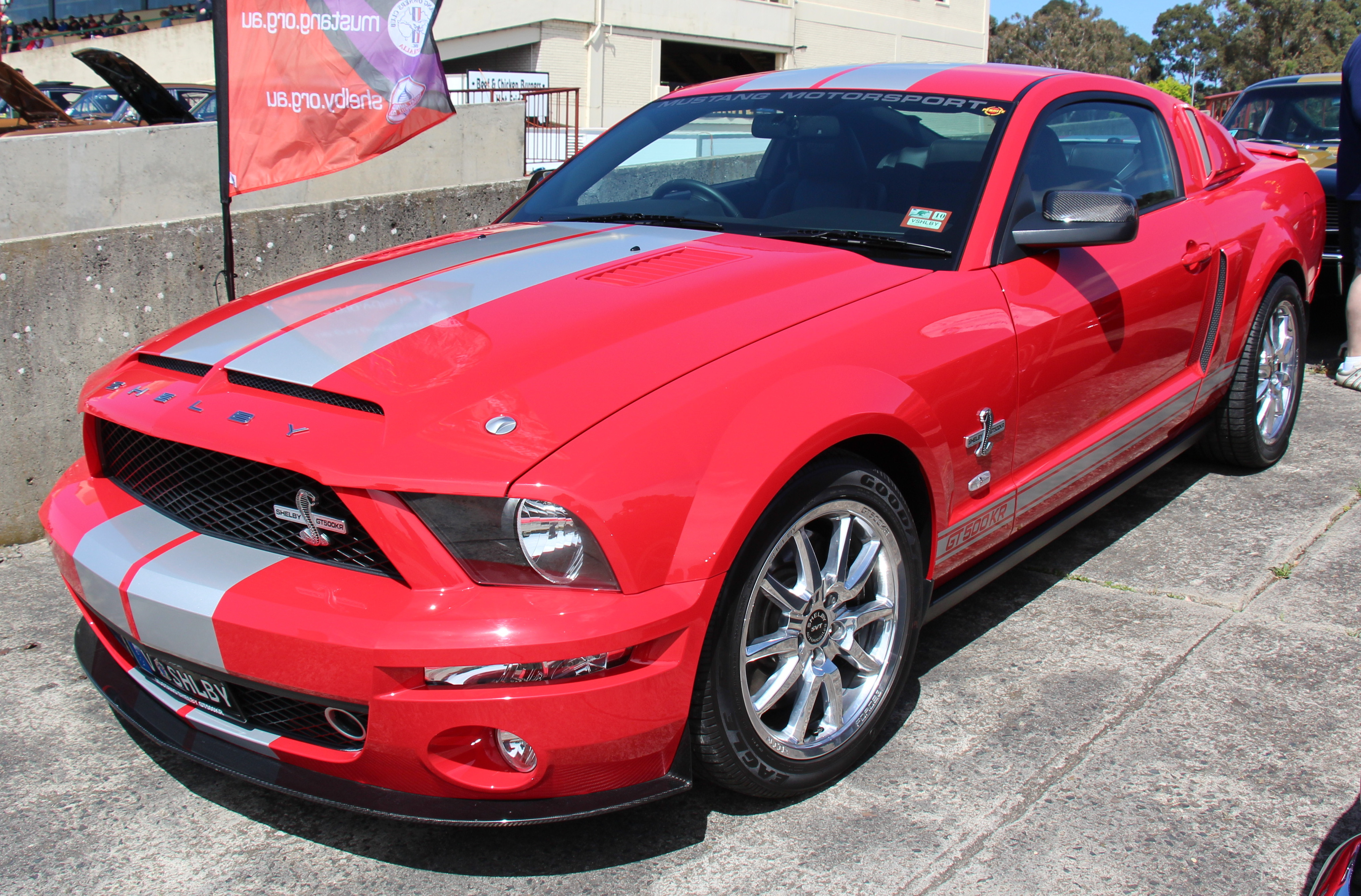
Shelby GT500KR

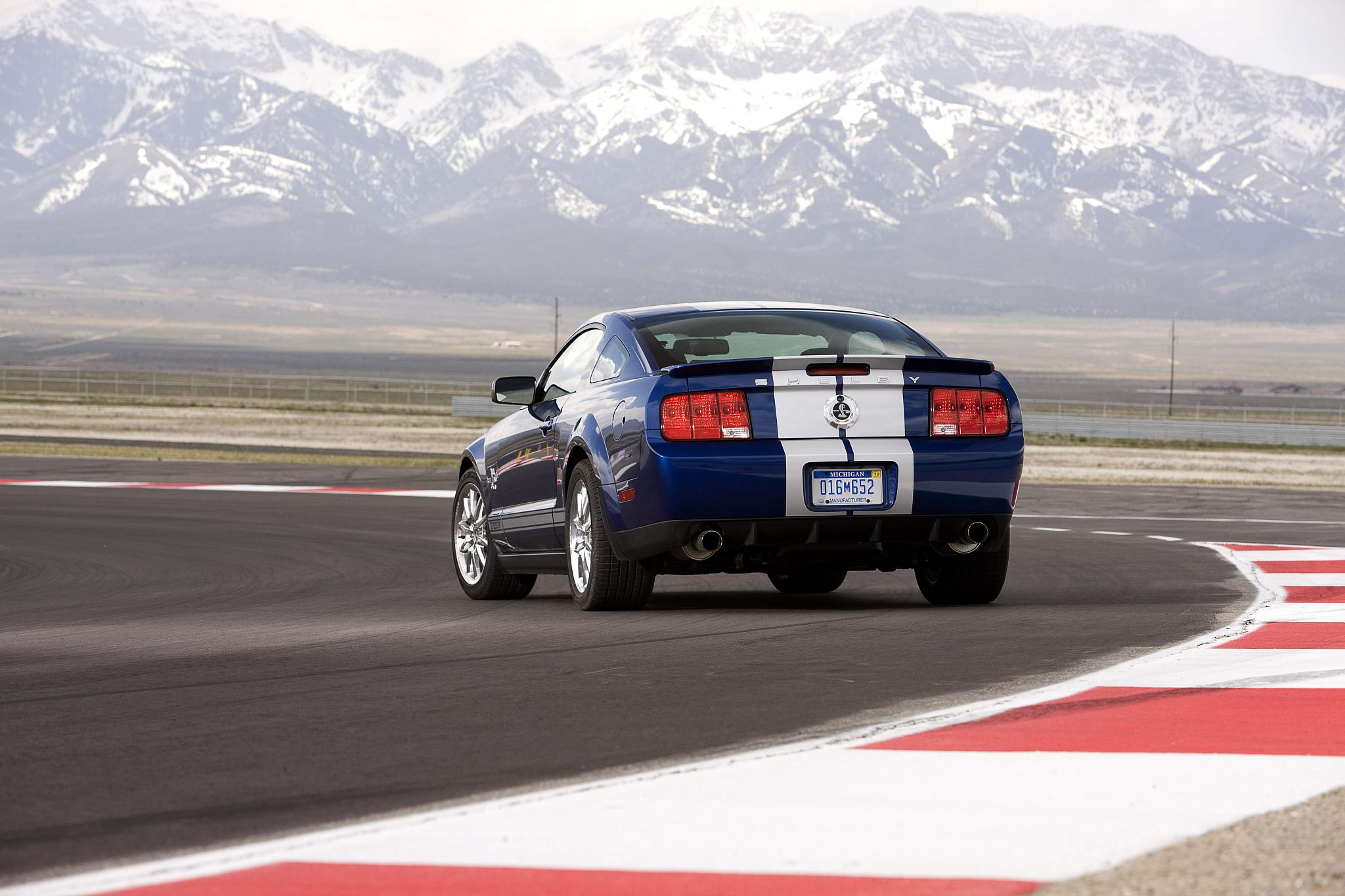
Shelby GT500KR

Debuting as a 2008 model and continuing for 2009, the Shelby GT500KR ("KR" being an abbreviation for "King of the Road") pays homage to the original 1968 Shelby Mustang of the same name. Production for the 2008 model year was limited to 1,011 units (including prototypes), with another 712 KR models built for the 2009 model year. The KR featured new components and performance enhancements over the standard GT500. The KR's engine was tuned to produce 540 hp (547 PS; 403 kW) at 6,250 rpm and 510 lb⋅ft (691 N⋅m) of torque at 4,500 rpm, gains of 40 hp (30 kW) and 30 lb⋅ft (41 N⋅m) of torque, respectively over the GT500's. The rear axle has a 3.73:1 ratio. To improve handling and help offset the car's front-heavy weight distribution, the GT500KR featured a Ford Racing strut tower brace and uniquely tuned struts, shocks, and springs. Using a carbon fiber hood and a revised exhaust system, the overall weight of the GT500KR was 22 lb (10 kg) lighter than a standard GT500.

=== Engines ===
Model	Years	Power, torque at rpm
Mustang (4.0 L V6)	2005–2010	210 hp (157 kW; 213 PS) at 5,300 rpm, 240 lb⋅ft (325 N⋅m) at 3,500 rpm
Mustang GT (4.6 L V8)	2005–2009	300 hp (224 kW; 304 PS) at 5,750 rpm, 320 lb⋅ft (434 N⋅m) at 4,500 rpm
Shelby GT500 (5.4 L SC V8)	2007–2009	500 hp (373 kW; 507 PS) at 6,000 rpm, 480 lb⋅ft (651 N⋅m) at 4,500 rpm
Mustang Bullitt (4.6 L V8)	2008–2009	315 hp (235 kW; 319 PS) at 6,000 rpm, 325 lb⋅ft (441 N⋅m) at 4,250 rpm

=== Motorsports ===
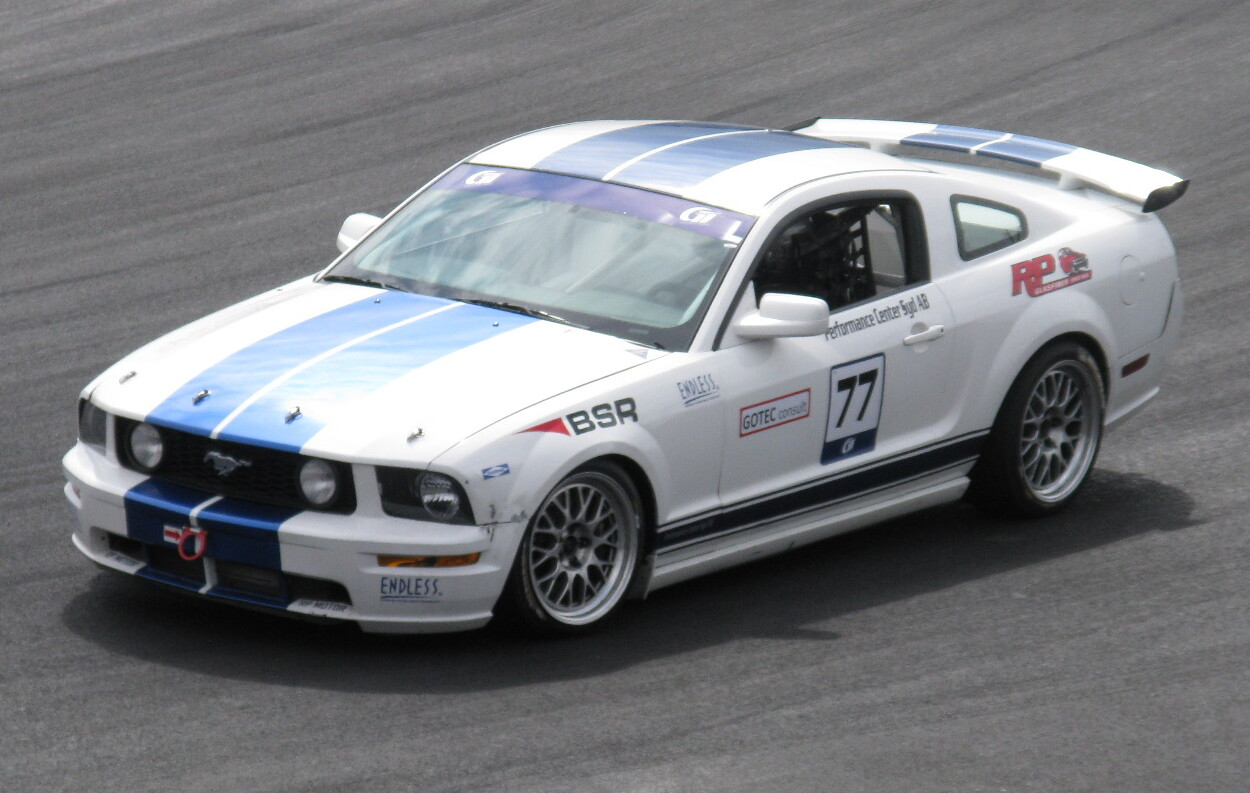
Ford Mustang GT4

In autocross, the S197 Shelby GT Mustang won the SCCA Pro Solo championship in the F-stock class from 2007 to 2009.

A Mustang won the drivers, team and manufacturers' championships for both the 2008 and 2009 seasons of Grand-Am Koni Challenge.

In 2009, the Mustang also won the SCCA Pro Racing World Challenge GT title. Blackforest Motorsports has entered a Mustang in the Rolex Sports Car Series GT class.

== Updates by model years ==
=== 2010 Mustang ===
2010–2014 Mustang (S197 II)
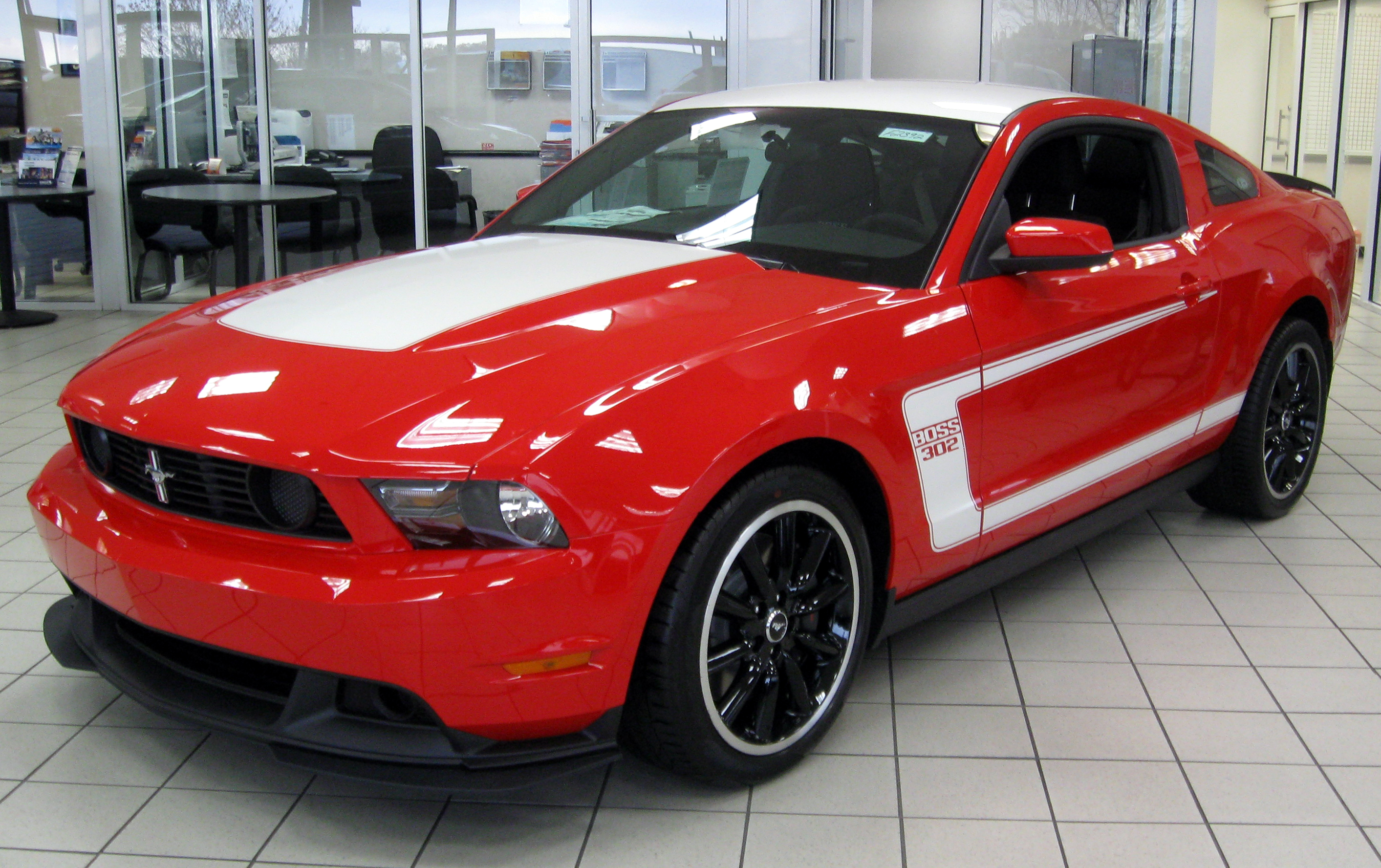

Overview
- Production: January 12, 2009 – June 20, 2014
- Model years: 2010–2014
- Designer: Doug Gaffka (S197 II design chief: 2005–07); George Saridikas (exterior: 2005, 2006); Robert Gelardi (interior: 2006, MY2013 facelift exterior: 2010)

Powertrain
- Engine: 3.7 L Cyclone V6; 4.0 L Cologne V6 (2010); 4.6 L Modular V8 (2010); 5.4 L Modular supercharged V8; 5.0 L Coyote V8; 5.8 L Modular supercharged V8
- Transmission: 5-speed manual (TR-3650); 6-speed manual (TR-6060, Getrag / Ford MT82); 5-speed automatic (5R55S); 6-speed (6R80) automatic

Dimensions
- Wheelbase: 107.1 in (2,720 mm)
- Length: 188.1 in (4,780 mm)
- Width: 73.9 in (1,880 mm)
- Height: 55.6 in (1,410 mm) (Coupe); 56.1 in (1,420 mm) (Convertible)
- Curb weight: V6 coupe MT/AT: 3,401 lb (1,543 kg)/3,454 lb (1,567 kg); V8 GT coupe MT/AT: 3,533 lb (1,603 kg)/3,575 lb (1,622 kg); V8 GT500 coupe MT: 3,852 lb (1,747 kg)

Chronology
- Predecessor: 2005–2009 Mustang (S197)
- Successor: 2015–2023 Mustang (S550)

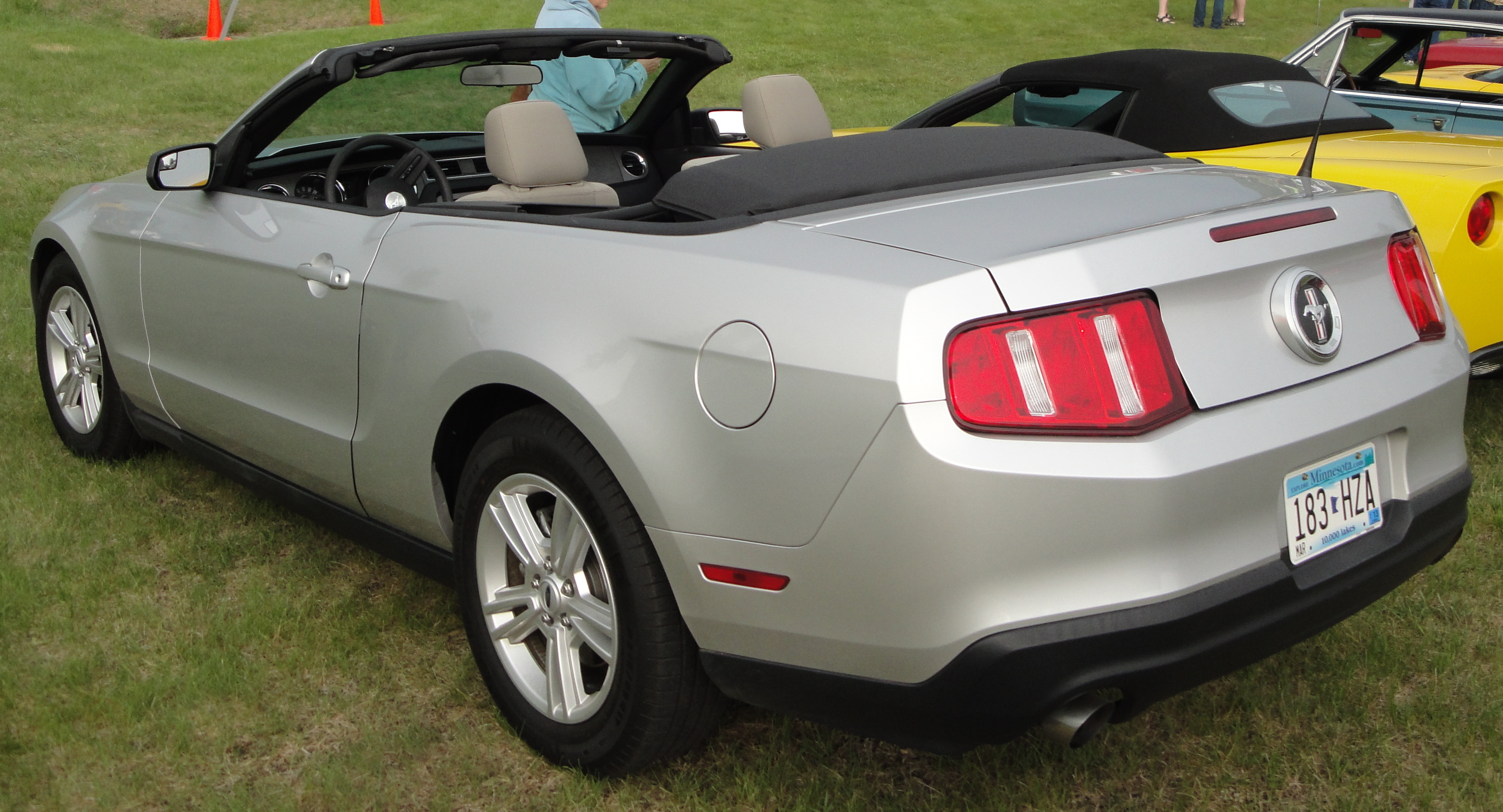
Ford Mustang convertible

Ford presented the 2010 model year Mustang on November 18, 2008, prior to the Los Angeles International Auto Show. Production began on January 12, 2009 and it went on sale in March 2009. The 2010 Mustang was a revision of the 2005–2009 models, retaining the D2C platform.

Design and development work began in 2004, designer George Saridikas' exterior proposal was chosen on September 29, 2005, along with Robert Gelardi's interior proposal (under chief S197 designer Doug Gaffka). Doug Gaffka subsequently was responsible for the design of the 2008–2009 Bullitt and the GT500KR, on MY2010 design selection in 2006. The resulting production exterior design of late 2006 was substantially revised, resulting in better aerodynamic performance (Ford claimed the coefficient of drag was reduced by 4% on V6 models and 7% on GT models, and that the front aerodynamic lift was reduced by 37% for V6 models and 23% for GT models.).

Specific changes to the exterior include a restyled Mustang emblem, a new headlight design with integrated turn signals, new slimmer side mirror design, a prominent "powerdome" hood, and revised three-lens taillights with LEDs that blink in sequence for turn indication. Additionally, the 2010 Mustang GT used smaller fog lights than the 2005–2009 models though they were still mounted in the car's grille. Fog lights on V6 models (a part of a revised Pony Package first introduced for 2006) are now mounted in the lower fascia below the grille. The radio antenna had been moved to the rear of the car and the lock for the trunk no longer featured a keyhole on the trunk lid, substituting with a remote trunk release only. In spite of its changes, the 2010 Mustang's overall exterior dimensions were nearly identical to the 2005–2009 models.

The Mustang's interior was revised featuring revised thermoplastic olefin surfaces, available real aluminum trim, and improved fit and finish. Ford SYNC became available as a factory-installed option on all trim levels of the Mustang except the base model.

This generation was the first to be sold in Japan in left-hand-drive form with exterior lighting modifications to comply with Japanese Government regulations.

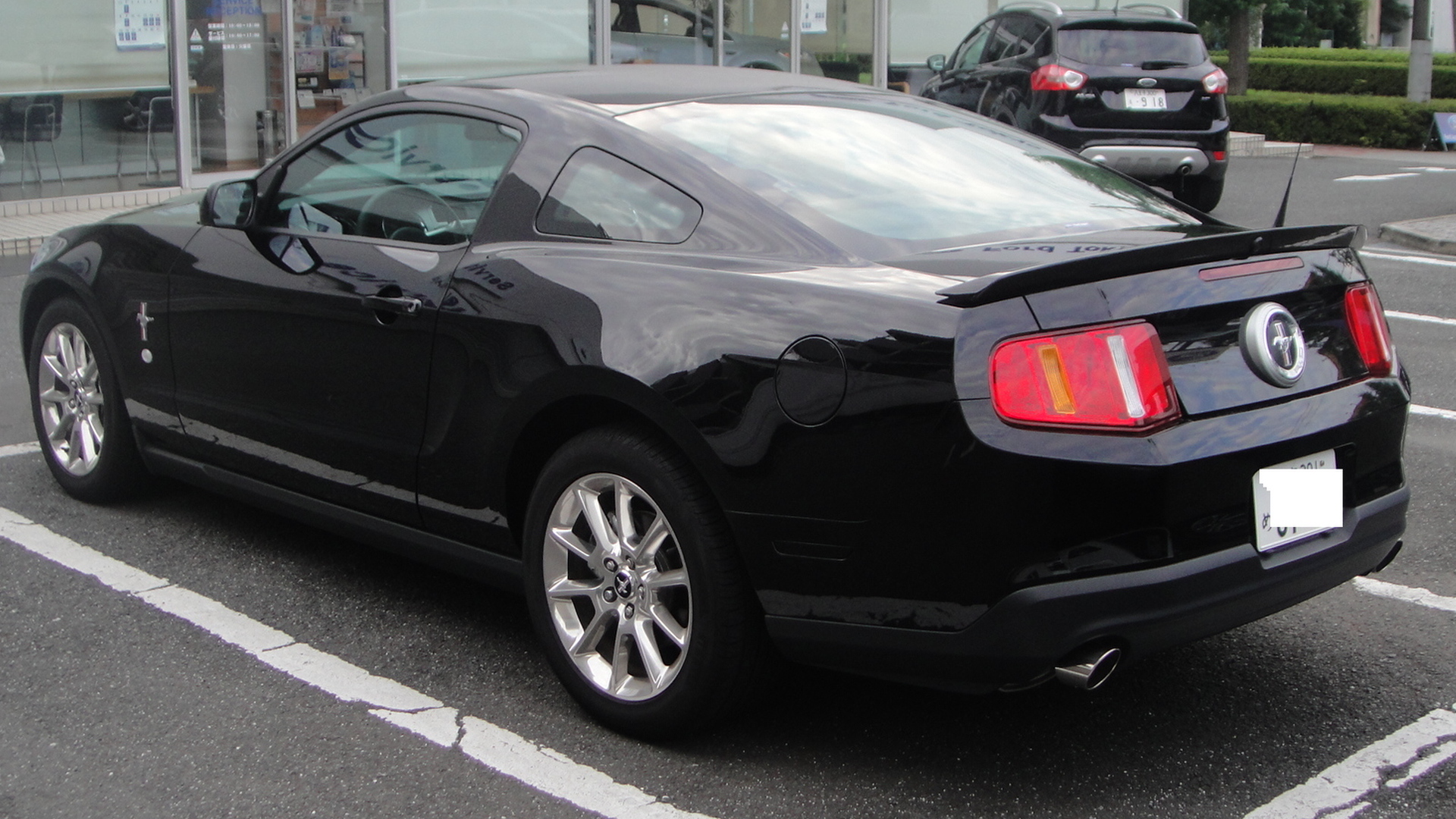
Japanese-market Mustang with deleted side marker lights, amber rather than red rear turn signal, and side turn signal repeater on front fender.

The standard engine was a 4.0 L V6 mated to a 5-speed manual transmission or an optional 5-speed automatic transmission. The V6 powertrains were unchanged from those used in 2005–2009 Mustangs. Though the 2010 Mustang V6 retained a single exhaust outlet, the diameter of the tip had been increased one-half of an inch to three inches. The 2010 Mustang included new spring rates and dampers to improve ride quality and control and Ford's AdvanceTrac traction and stability control system standard. Newly standard on the base Mustang were 17-inch painted aluminum wheels while 18-inch wheels continue to be optional (except for V8 models, where 18-inch wheels were mounted by default). Other new available features and options for the 2010 Mustang included Ford SYNC, dual-zone automatic climate control, an updated navigation system with Sirius Travel Link, a capless fuel filler, a reverse camera system to aid in backing up, and an updated version of the V6 Pony Package.

=== 2011–2012 Mustangs ===
For 2011, the aging 4.0 L V6 used in the Mustang since the 2005 model year was replaced with Ford's Duratec 37 3.7 L DOHC V6. Unlike earlier V6s, the new engine featured Twin-independent Variable Cam Timing (Ti-VCT), true dual exhaust (compared to the single outlet exhaust for the previous 4.0 L V6); this engine was rated to produce an improved 305 bhp (227 kW) at 6,500 rpm and 280 lb⋅ft (380 N⋅m) of torque at 4250 rpm.

The upgraded powertrains were capable of achieving better fuel efficiency due in part to the new transmissions. With the standard Getrag MT82 6-speed manual transmission co-developed with Ford, the Mustang had been rated by the EPA to achieve 19 mpg_{‑US} (12 L/100 km; 23 mpg_{‑imp}) in city driving and 29 mpg_{‑US} (8.1 L/100 km; 35 mpg_{‑imp}) on the highway. The newly-optional Ford 6R60 6-speed automatic achieved 19 mpg_{‑US} (12 L/100 km; 23 mpg_{‑imp}) in city and 31 mpg_{‑US} (7.6 L/100 km; 37 mpg_{‑imp}) on the highway. A newly standard 2.73:1 limited-slip rear axle was more fuel efficient compared to the more aggressive 3.31:1 axle used previously. The 3.31:1 axle remained available in the 2011 Mustang as a performance option.

The 2011 Mustang offered a V6 Performance Package starting in the summer of 2010. The package featured a standard 3.31:1 rear axle, stiffer suspension tuning, 19-inch wheels with performance tires, a strut tower brace, and performance-oriented electronic stability control calibration.

Other, non-powertrain related upgrades made to the 2011 Mustang included a Nexteer Automotive Electric Power Steering (EPS) system with pull-drift compensation and active nibble control, general aerodynamic and NVH improvements over the 2010 Mustang, a digital message/information center, blind spot mirrors integrated into the car's side mirrors, a universal garage door opener, a 160 mph speedometer, and Ford's MyKey programmable vehicle key technology.

=== Cobra Jet (2012) ===
The Mustang Cobra Jet is a 2012 Mustang that was the same design as the GT500 but it has wider tires and a bigger engine. Cobra Jet Mustangs were sold only to professional drag racers and came without a VIN, making it impossible to register them as a road car.

=== 2013–2014 Mustangs ===
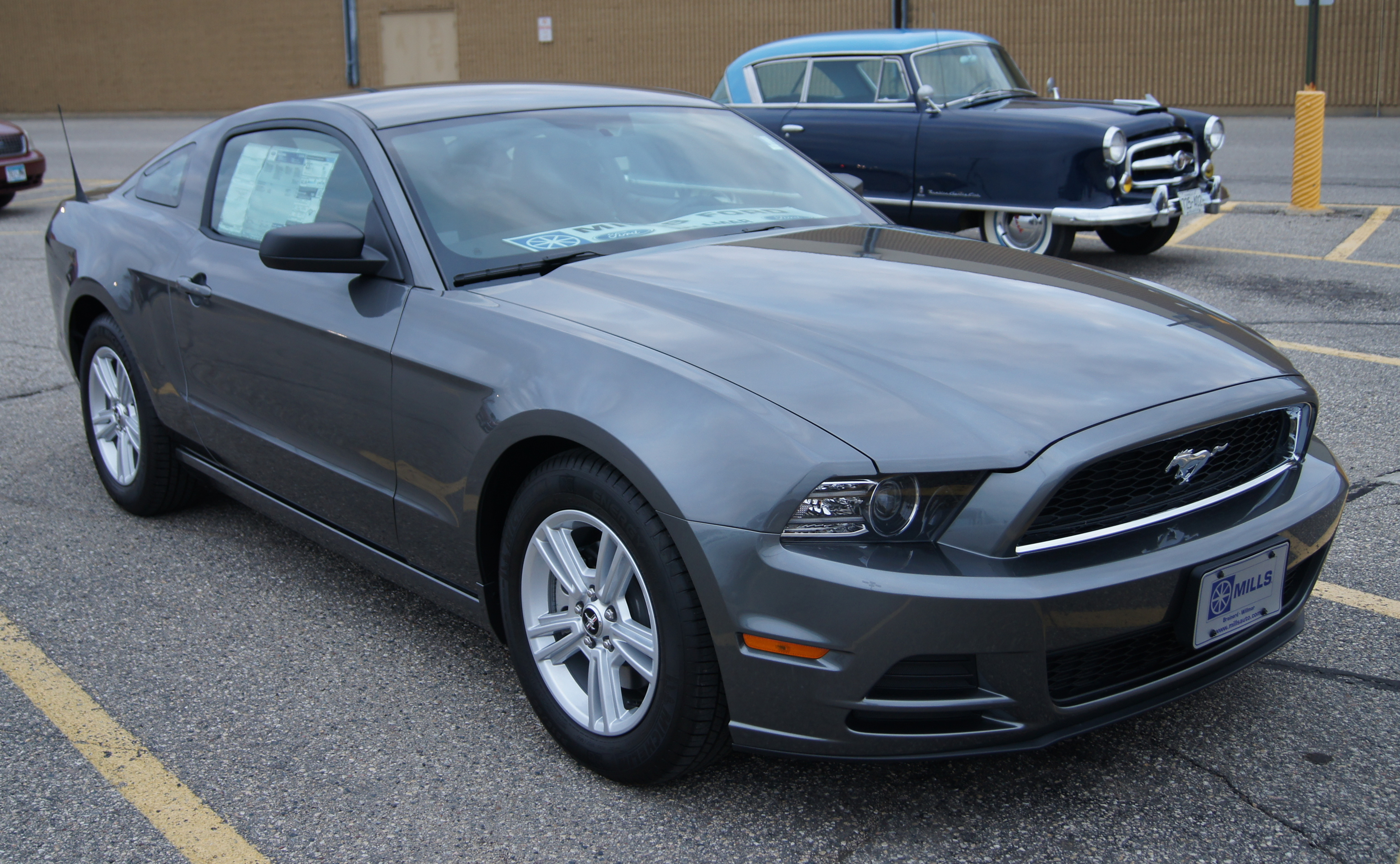
2014 Ford Mustang

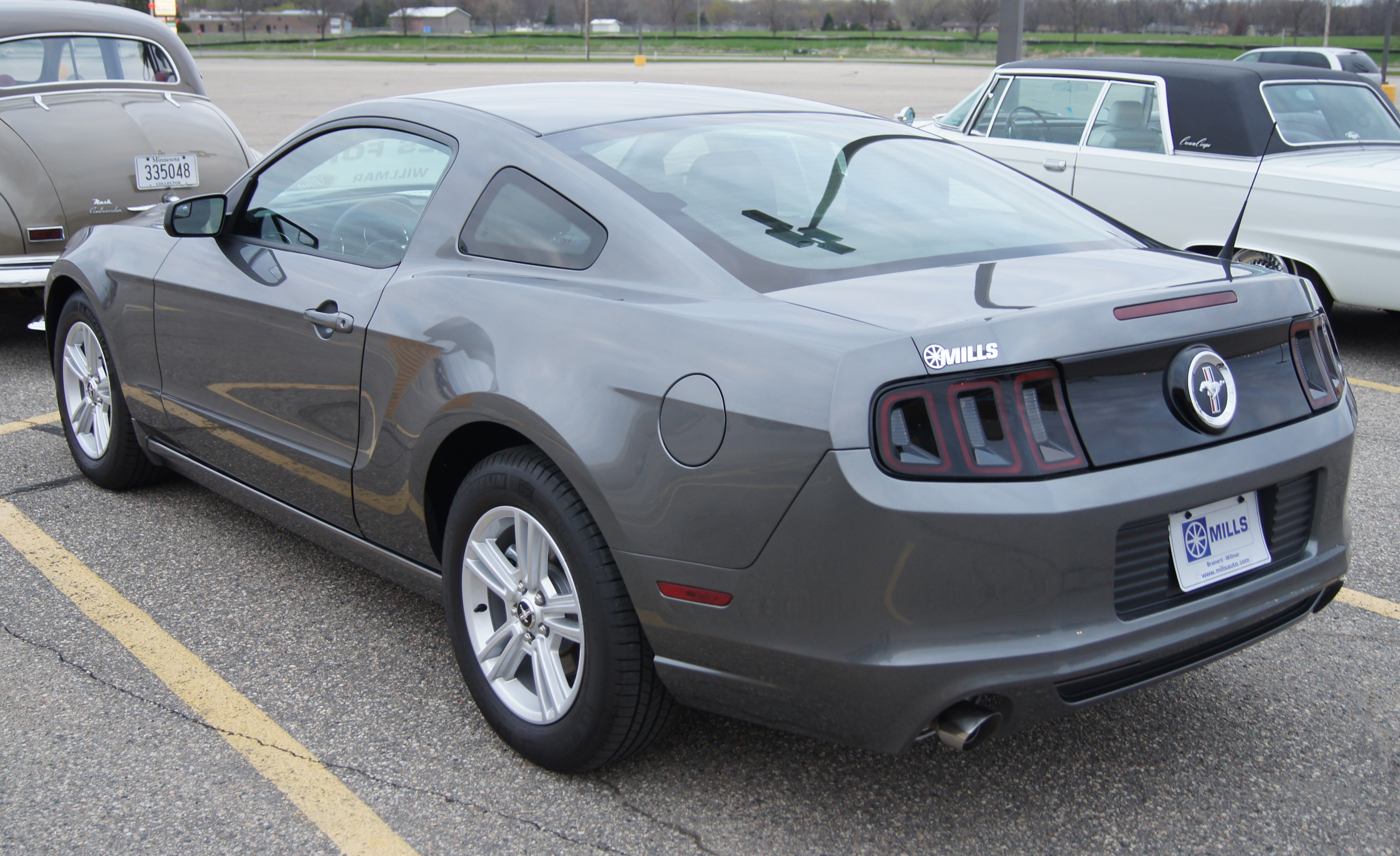
2014 Ford Mustang

Between 2009 and 2010, development took place on further updates to the second-generation S197. In late 2010 design work (by Robert Gelardi) was frozen, with prototypes being first spotted in May 2011. On November 2, 2011, Ford unveiled the 2013 model year Mustang. The 2013 model year Mustang exterior was updated with a new front fascia featuring a larger grille, standard HiD headlamps and two LED accent strips adjacent to the headlamp lens. Models equipped with the Pony Package offered LED lighting mounted on the side-view mirrors that produce a projection of a running horse on the ground, 18-inch wheels, and lower valance fog lamps. In the rear, LED tail lamp clusters included sequential turn signals (as with 2010–2012 Mustangs) and a reverse indicator light integrated within the brake light. The trunk lid included a black panel that united the left and right tail lamp clusters. Several new wheel designs were offered.

Inside, Ford now offered a 4.2 inch display between the speedometer and tachometer on Premium models. Selections in this information display included G-force, acceleration times, air-fuel ratio, cylinder head temperature, and oil temperature. All models equipped with the 6-speed automatic transmission included a SelectShift feature, which provided drivers the ability to choose and hold a gear and to shift manually.

=== Mustang GT ===
==== 2010 ====
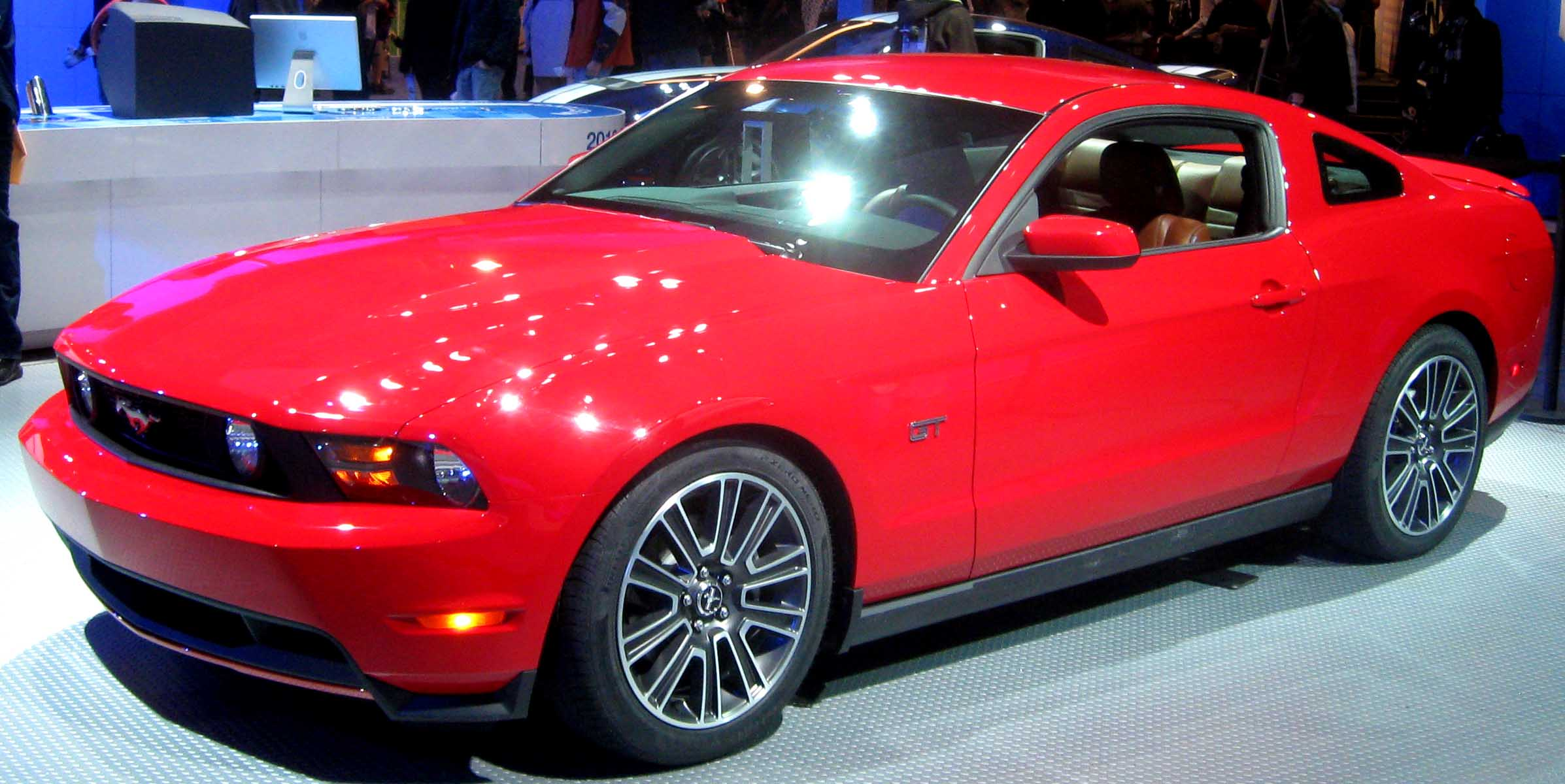
2010 Ford Mustang GT

The 2010 Mustang GT added a more powerful version of the 4.6 L V8 seen in 2005–2009 Mustang GTs. The Mustang GT's revised V8 produced 315 bhp (235 kW) at 6000 rpm and 325 lb⋅ft (441 N⋅m) of torque at 4250 rpm. The 5-speed manual and automatic transmissions offered with the updated V8 continued unchanged from before. The size of the 2010 Mustang GT's dual exhaust tips had been increased by one-half of an inch to 3.5 in (89 mm) while the exhaust note has been improved to enhance the sound of the V8. Like the base V6-equipped Mustang, the 2010 Mustang GT included new spring rates and dampers to improve ride quality and control. AdvanceTrac was also standard in the Mustang GT though a special Sport Mode setting was added for spirited driving. The 2010 Mustang GT came with standard 18-inch wheels – one inch greater than the previous Mustang GT's standard wheels – while 19-inch wheels were a new option.

Newly available for the Mustang GT for 2010 were two performance packages. The 3.73 Axle Package featured higher performance front brake pads, a more aggressive 3.73:1 rear axle, and a recalibrated AdvanceTrac system. The Track Package featured higher performance front and rear brake pads, stabilizer bars and rear lower control arms from the GT500, uniquely tuned shocks and struts, Pirelli summer tires (includes automatic upgrade to 19-inch wheels), a 3.73:1 rear axle with carbon plates in the differential, and a recalibrated AdvanceTrac system.

==== 2011 & 2012 5.0 GTs ====
Starting in late 2010 for the 2011 model year, the Mustang GT's engine became an all-aluminum 32-valve 5.0 L DOHC V8, codenamed Coyote. The 2011 Mustang GT marked this engine's first use in any production Ford. While the new engine's displacement was similar to Ford's original "5.0" 4.9 L (302 cu in) V8, it was an unrelated design and instead shared more in common with the 4.6 L V8 and other Modular engines that it replaced. The new 5.0 used a DOHC head design like other Modular engines and even shared its bore spacing and deck height with the outgoing 4.6 L V8. Differing the new engine from earlier Modular engines, among other features, was its use of wider bore diameters (and a longer stroke relative to the 4.6 L V8 in particular), to allow the use of larger valves, and camshaft torque-actuated Twin-independent Variable Cam Timing (Ti-VCT). This more advanced design is approximately 430 lb (195 kg) – about 10 lb (5 kg) heavier than the Mustang GT's previous 4.6 L V8. redline had been raised to 7,000 rpm. Using premium grade, 91-octane or higher gasoline, the new 5.0 L V8 could produce 412 bhp (307 kW) at 6500 rpm and 390 lb⋅ft (529 N⋅m) of torque at 4250 rpm. Output of the 5.0 drops to 402 bhp (300 kW) at 6500 rpm and 377 lb⋅ft (511 N⋅m) of torque at 4250 rpm when regular grade gasoline is used.

The new 5.0 incorporates piston cooling oil jets that helped warm the engine faster and keep the engine running cooler under load. Racing style tubular headers replaced the standard cast iron headers. Coolant and oil flow patterns were optimized for proper flow when under high lateral forces, such as those experienced when on a road course track.

The Mustang GT also got new transmissions for 2011. Both transmissions are heavier duty versions of the same designs offered with the V6 Mustang; a Getrag/Ford MT82 6-speed manual transmission and Ford's 6R80 6-speed automatic transmission. The 6-speed manual transmission came with a 3.31:1 rear axle while 6-speed automatics get a taller 3.15:1 rear axle. Combined with its new & more efficient V8, the new 6-speed transmissions contributed to an improvement in fuel economy in the 2011 Mustang GT over its counterpart from the 2010 model year. As certified by the EPA, manual transmission models were able to achieve 17 mpg_{‑US} (14 L/100 km; 20 mpg_{‑imp}) in city and 26 mpg_{‑US} (9.0 L/100 km; 31 mpg_{‑imp}) on the highway while automatic transmission models were able to achieve 18 mpg_{‑US} (13 L/100 km; 22 mpg_{‑imp}) in city and 25 mpg_{‑US} (9.4 L/100 km; 30 mpg_{‑imp}) on the highway.

The Mustang GT gained the same non-powertrain related upgrades that standard V6 Mustangs got for 2011. Other, new features exclusive to the 2011 Mustang GT included "5.0" fender badges replacing the "GT" badges used previously, an optional Brembo Brake Package includes 14 inch Brembo front disk brakes taken from the Shelby GT500, unique 19-inch wheels with Pirelli P-Zero ultra high performance summer only tires, a unique calibration of the Advanced Track stability system including a "sport" mode, and suspension enhancements such as stiffer springs (less aggressive than the BOSS 302 and Shelby models but more so than the regular GT models) and various other suspension enhancements. Convertible versions of the Mustang GT in particular received a front strut tower brace, stiffened crossmembers, and other enhancements resulting in a 12% increase in structural rigidity compared to 2010 Mustang GT convertibles. All 2011 Mustang GT's with 19 inch wheels (Brembo brake equipped, California special, etc.) also received the strut tower brace and stiffened cross members.

Taller rear head rests were added in the middle of the 2012 model year for whiplash protection, with fold down feature for visibility when rear passengers are not present. The rear fascia is altered for slightly better aerodynamics than the 2010 as well.

==== 'High Gear' concept (2012) ====
The Mustang 'High Gear' concept is a concept car designed by Jennifer Seely of Ford and based on a 2013 Ford Mustang GT. The design was inspired by international products in categories such as jewelry, couture clothing, and architecture. The vehicle included rose-gold chrome accents throughout the exterior and interior; satin-black body; quilted suede seats with leather-wrapped interior upholstery. Modifications were also made to the engine, undercarriage, drivetrain, and sound system. The vehicle was unveiled at the 2012 SEMA show, during the first SEMA Mustang Build Powered by Women event.

==== 2013–2014 Mustang GT ====
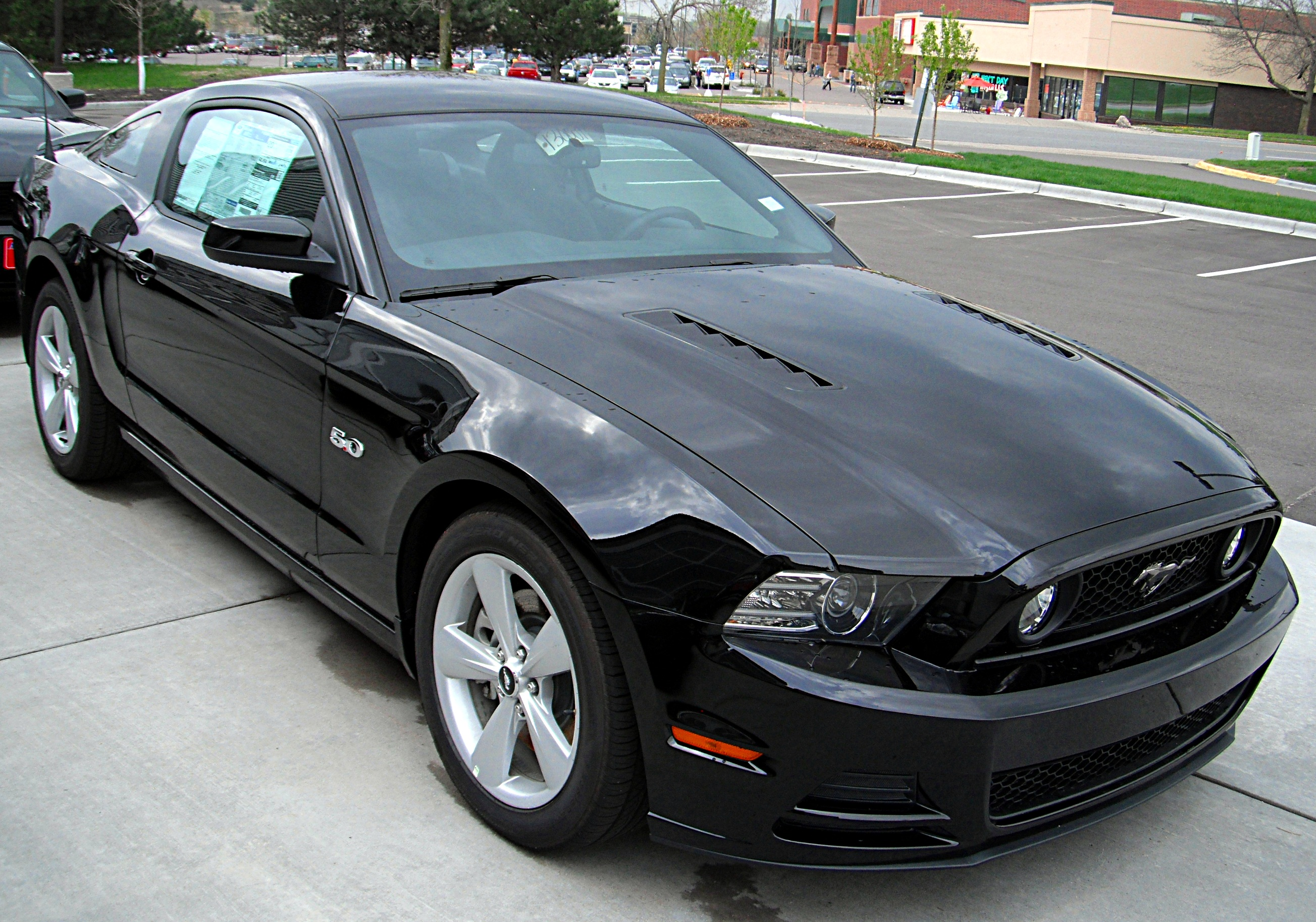
2013 Ford Mustang GT

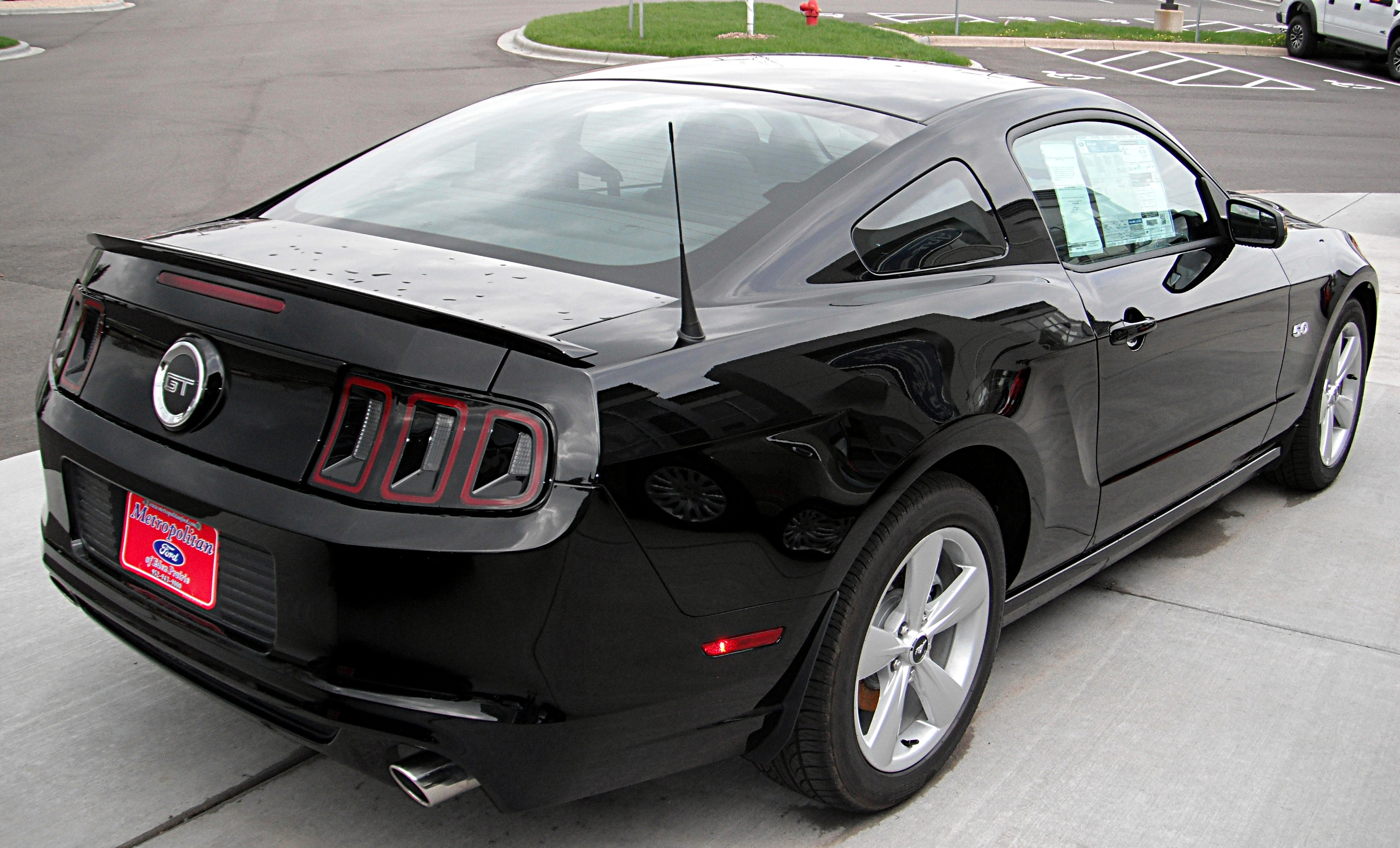
2013 Ford Mustang GT

Changes for the 2013 model year included standard "blacked out" tail lights and a front fascia similar to the styling of the Shelby GT500 models. The GT models include LED fog lights mounted in the grille and functional heat extractors on the sides of the hood. The engine gained 8 horsepower (6 kW) for a total of 420.

A new Track Package was offered for manual transmission GT Coupes.

GT Track Package included the complete Brembo brake package, a 3.73:1 Torsen helical-cut limited-slip differential, Boss 302 aluminum radiator, Boss 302 engine oil cooler, and numerous suspension changes.

Recaro sport seat option added for the Coupe.

==== U.S. Air Force Thunderbirds Edition 2014 Ford Mustang GT (2013) ====
To commemorate the 60th anniversary of the U.S. Air Force Thunderbirds, Ford released a single special edition 2014 Ford Mustang GT coupe, VIN 0001. The car is white with red and blue accents and features USAF markings and logos, wide body modifications, a handcrafted and painted belly pan by Creations n' Chrome that emulated the appearance of an F-16 Thunderbird, front and rear wide body elements by TS Designs, custom 22-inch wheels by Forgiato, a modified navigation screen, instrument cluster, rear seat delete, Recaro seats with embroidered Thunderbirds elements, unique sill plates and puddle lamps, a Ford Racing supercharger, suspension handling pack and Brembo brakes.

The vehicle was sold at the Gathering of Eagles charity event during the Experimental Aircraft Association (EAA) AirVenture Oshkosh 2013. The vehicle was purchased by James Slattery of San Diego, California for $398,000.

=== Mustang Boss 302 ===
2012 Boss 302
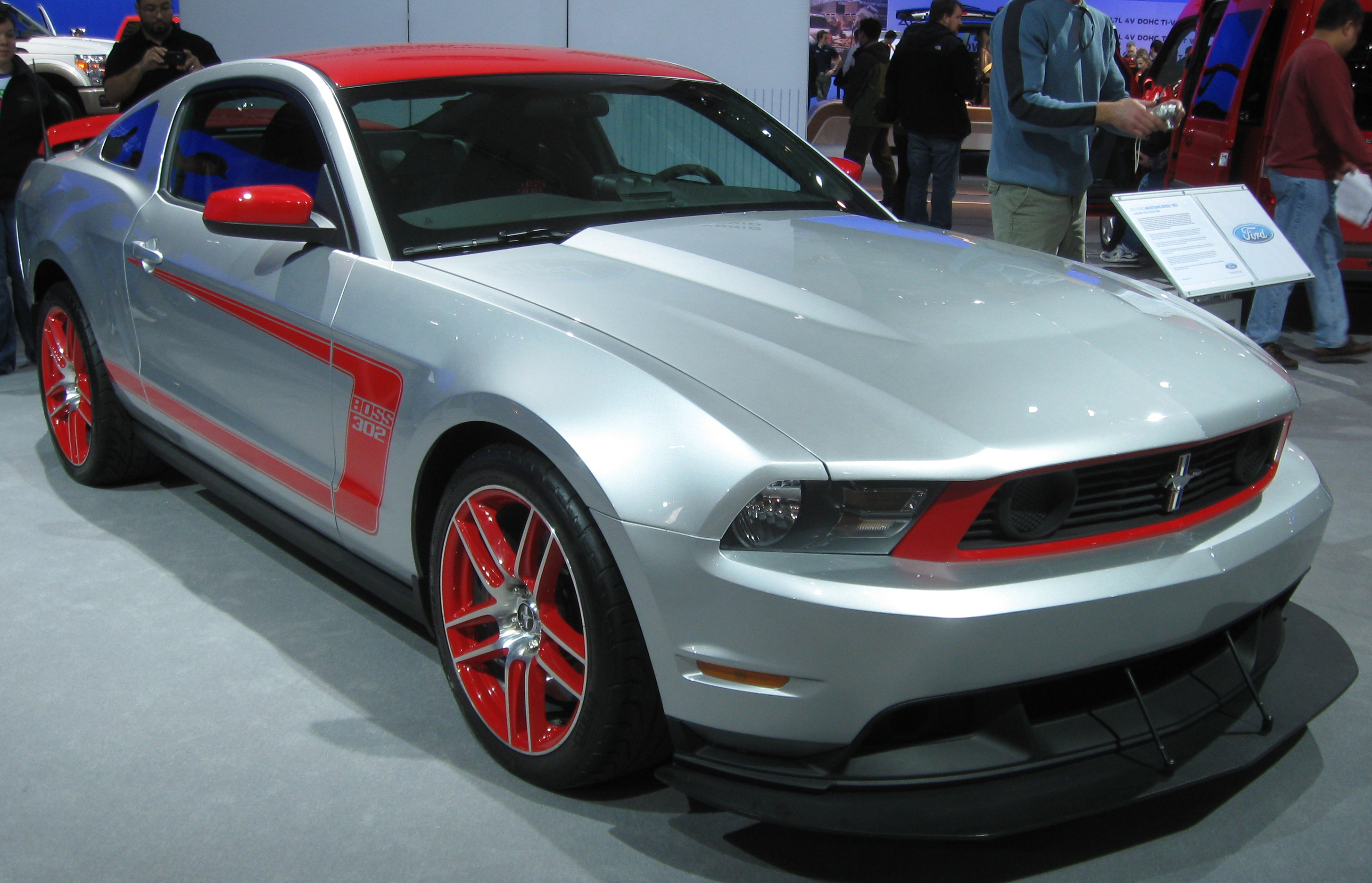

Overview
- Production: 2011–2013
- Designer: Robert Gelardi (2009); Melvin Betancourt (facelift: 2010)

Body and chassis
- Body style: 2-door Coupe
- Platform: 5th Generation Mustang

Powertrain
- Engine: 5.0 L V8
- Transmission: 6-speed manual

Dimensions
- Wheelbase: 107.1 in (2,720 mm)
- Length: 188.1 in (4,780 mm)
- Width: 73.9 in (1,880 mm)
- Height: 55.6 in (1,410 mm)
- Curb weight: 3,631 lb (1,647 kg)

Ford revived the Boss 302 nameplate for 2012. The standard 2011 Ford Mustang GT's 5.0-liter V8 is enhanced with an upgraded intake system, forged rotating assembly, CNC ported heads, revised camshafts and a high flow "runners in the box" intake taken from the 302R racecar. It produces 444 hp (331 kW) – 32 hp (24 kW) over the standard GT's 412 hp (307 kW). The engine produces 380 lb⋅ft (515 N⋅m) of torque, about 10 lb⋅ft (14 N⋅m) of torque less at peak when compared to the standard GT, and comes with a six-speed MT-82 manual transmission. A 3.73 rear axle uses carbon fiber plates in its limited-slip differential or an optional Torsen differential.

The quad exhaust system is made up of two standard Mustang GT outlets and two side pipes that exit on either side of the rear crossover. The side pipes send the exhaust through a set of metal "attenuation" discs to create an extra growling exhaust sound. The discs are removable and include a spacer plate sized to match aftermarket exhaust dump valves.

The Boss 302 takes the Mustang GT's suspension and adds higher-rate coil springs, stiffer bushings, and a larger diameter rear stabilizer bar. The body is lowered 11 mm (0.4 in) up front and just 1 mm (0.0 in) in the rear to give it a more raked stance designed to recall the original. The shocks are adjustable at the shock tower by using a flat head screwdriver. The standard Mustang traction and stability control programs have been altered with a new intermediate sport mode designed to allow for more flexibility on the track.

The aero package is almost entirely copied from the Boss 302R race car. The 19-inch black-alloy racing wheels are 9 inches wide up front and 9.5 inches out back and come with Pirelli P-Zero tires.

While more powerful than a standard GT, the Boss 302 did not offer many of the luxury amenities of other Mustang models. Features not available on the Boss 302 included a premium audio system, a Bluetooth phone system (the Ford Sync system was added on later models), SiriusXM Satellite Radio, and power-adjustable front seats.

=== Boss 302 Laguna Seca edition ===
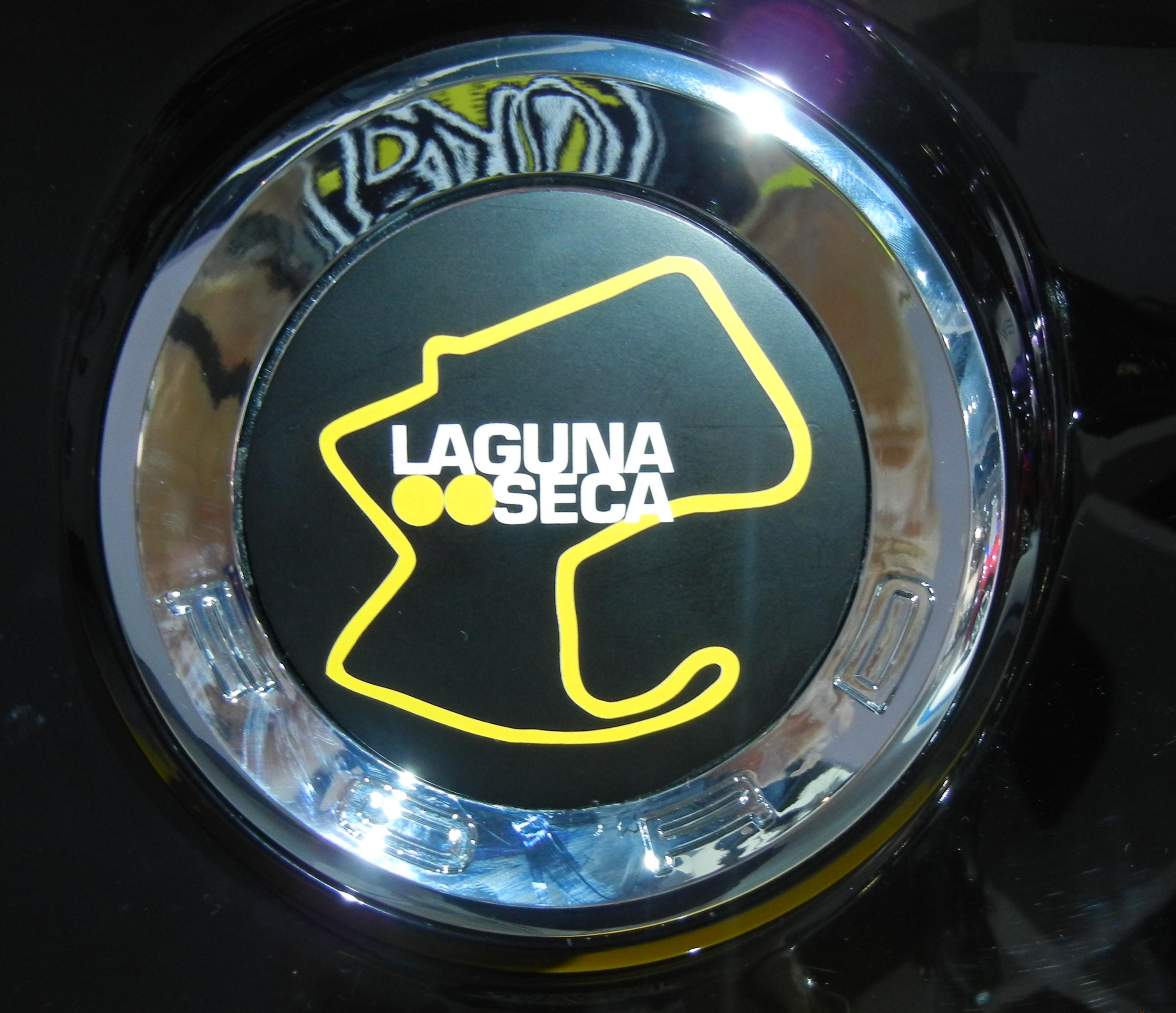
Laguna Seca edition has map of track on rear badge

The Boss 302 Laguna Seca edition is a further upgraded version of the Boss 302. Additions include Recaro sport seats, a Torsen limited-slip rear differential (both optional on the standard Boss 302), revised suspension tuning with unique spring and damper rates, and a larger rear stabilizer. The Laguna Seca model loses its rear seats, which are replaced by a cross-car X-brace to increase structural rigidity approximately 10%. It rides on 19×9-inch front and 19×10-inch rear lightweight alloy wheels with R-compound ultra high-performance tires. Ford Racing front brake ducts help cool the brakes.

The 2012 Laguna Seca Boss 302 comes in two colors – Black or Ingot Silver – with a red roof and red accents. For 2013, color choices include both School Bus Yellow and Black, both with reflective matte silver stripes. A more aggressive front splitter and a larger rear spoiler increase downforce for high speed track use. Only 750 Laguna Seca versions will be built each year for the two-year run (for a total of 1500).

The limited-edition Laguna Seca is designed to bridge the gap between the Boss 302 and the Boss 302R.

=== Shelby GT500 ===
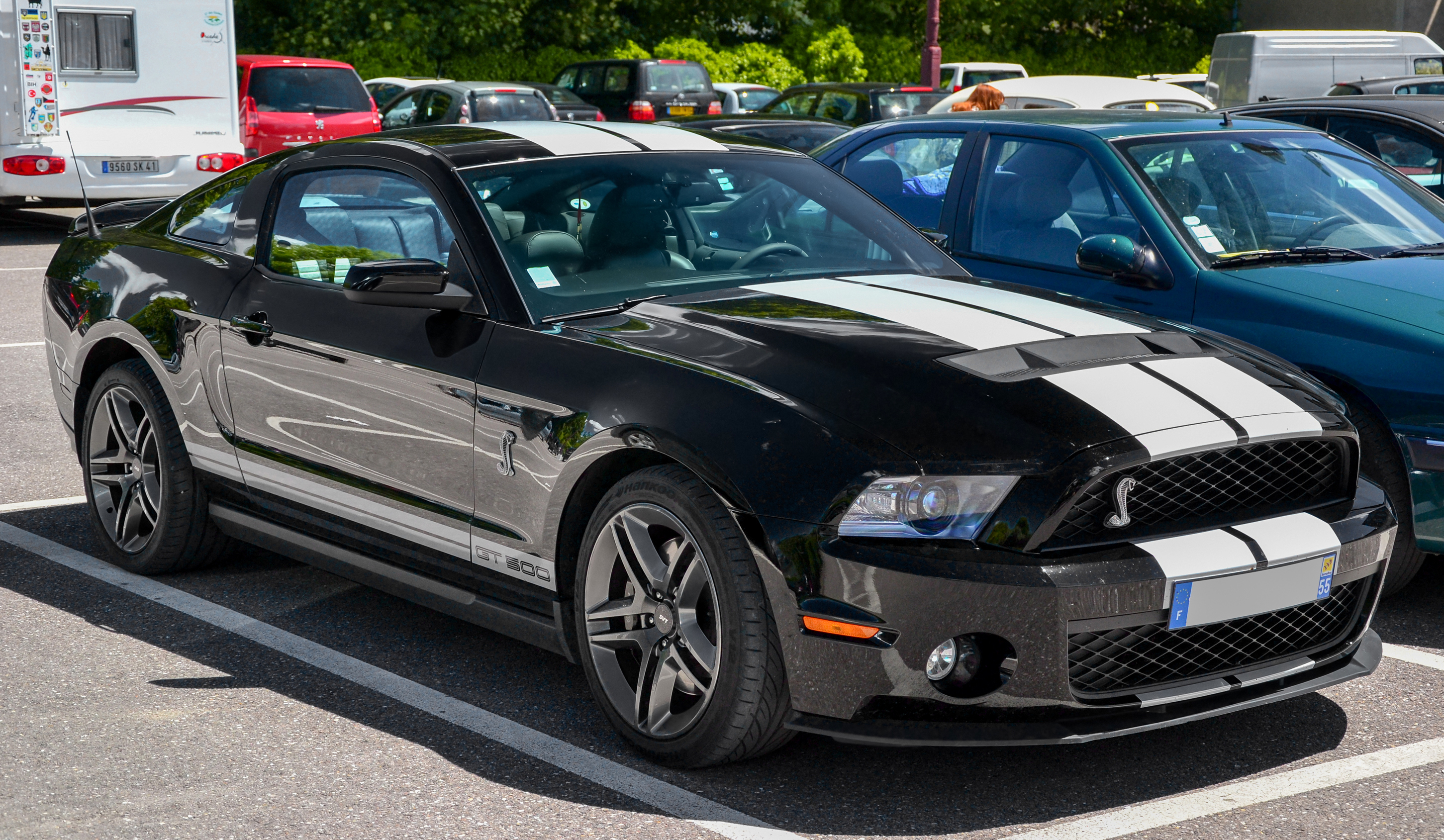
Shelby GT500

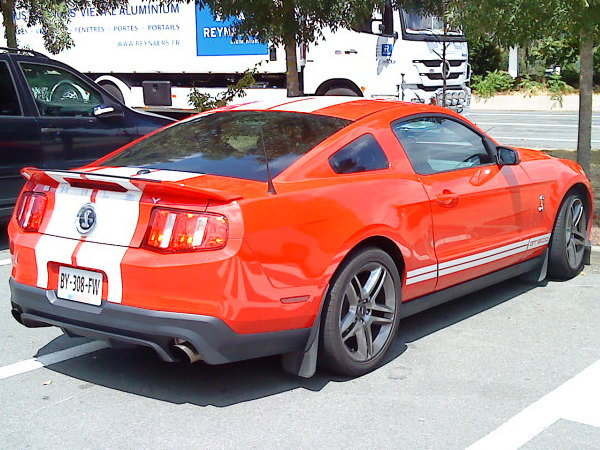
Shelby GT500

The 2010 Shelby GT500 was revealed by Ford through a press release on January 1, 2009, prior to a public unveiling at the 2009 North American International Auto Show. Many of the basic design characteristics of the new GT500 are shared with that of the Mustang and Mustang GT. The GT500 gains the same exterior and interior updates as the 2010 Mustang and Mustang GT. The front fascia is new with larger upper and lower grilles, a unique hood, large fog lights mounted in the lower front fascia (similar to the previous GT500), Shelby's signature cobra badges on the grille, front fenders, and trunk lid medallion (with Shelby lettering over the medallion), 19-inch wheels (18-inch on the convertible model), and a Gurney Flap rear spoiler. Inside the GT500 gains a cobra disc on the steering wheel, shift ball, and seats with embroidered cobras.

Mechanically the 2010 Shelby GT500 remains closely related to the 2007–2009 GT500, but the 2010 model has been upgraded with various features similar to or found in the 2008 Shelby GT500KR. A conical cold air intake and other enhancements to the GT500's supercharged 5.4 L DOHC V8 have resulted in an increase in output to 540 bhp (403 kW) at 6200 rpm and 510 lb⋅ft (691 N⋅m) at 4500 rpm, gains of 40 bhp (30 kW) and 30 lb⋅ft (41 N⋅m) of torque over the 2007–2009 GT500 respectively. The Tremec TR-6060 6-speed manual transmission returns for the 2010 GT500 but has been enhanced with larger clutch discs (250 mm (9.8 in) versus the 215 mm (8.5 in) discs used previously) and other measures to increase performance and noise, vibration, and harshness (NVH) control. Additionally, the fifth and sixth gear ratios of the transmission have been changed from 0.80 to 0.74 and 0.63 to 0.50 respectively, contributing to an improvement in fuel efficiency that the 2010 GT500 enjoys over its predecessor. Complementing the transmission's gear ratio changes is a new, more aggressive 3.55:1 ratio rear axle which replaces the 3.31:1 axle used previously. According to Inside Line, drivers of the new 2010 Shelby can expect 0 to 60 mph (97 km/h) times in 4.3 seconds from a stand still and 4 seconds flat with roll out. Elsewhere, the GT500's aluminum hood, in addition to be stylistically different from that of the Mustang and Mustang GT, features an air extractor that helps cool the engine. Various aerodynamic upgrades, such as the design of the front fascia and the aforementioned Gurney Flap spoiler, contribute to increased downward force and a reduced coefficient of drag. Suspension enhancements found in the GT500KR are used in the 2010 GT500 to improve handling and, specifically, provide better roll control. The 2010 GT500 features Ford's AdvanceTrac traction and stability control system standard with different settings to control the level of performance the driver desires.

The 2010 Shelby GT500 was released in the spring of 2009.

==== 2011–2012 ====
For 2011, the Shelby GT500 received significant performance enhancements and other upgrades. Arguably the most important of the GT500's upgrades is a new aluminum engine block for the car's supercharged 5.4 L DOHC V8, replacing the cast-iron block used previously. The block's cylinder bores are coated with an iron and iron oxide composite that is applied with Plasma Transferred Wire Arc (PTWA) technology, which was developed jointly by Ford and Flame-Spray Industries. The developers of PTWA received the IPO 2009 National Inventor of the Year award. The coating allows for the replacement of traditional cast-iron cylinder liners and marks Ford's first use of this process. Between this and the use of lighter-weight aluminum for the engine block, the new block is 102 lb (46 kg) lighter than the previous cast-iron version, contributing to a reduction in the overall weight of the GT500 compared to the 2010 model. Thanks to the new liner coating, which has friction-reducing characteristics, and a revised exhaust, horsepower production from the 5.4 L V8 has increased slightly for a total of 550 bhp (410 kW) at 6200 rpm. The combination of the lighter engine, EPAS, and aerodynamic enhancements result in an improvement in fuel efficiency for the 2011 GT500 relative to the 2010 model that eliminates the car's gas guzzler tax.

A newly optional SVT Performance Package includes a 3.73:1 rear axle, Goodyear Eagle F1 SuperCar G:2 tires, forged aluminum 19-inch wheels in the front and 20-inch in the rear, as well as a firmer suspension tuning.

The 2011 Shelby GT500 gains the same non-powertrain related upgrades that standard V6 Mustangs and Mustang GTs. New features include standard HID headlights and a glass roof option.

==== 2013 ====
The 2013 Shelby GT500 features the 5.8 L Trinity V8 engine rated at 662 bhp (671 PS; 494 kW) at 6500 rpm and 631 lb⋅ft (856 N⋅m) at 4000 rpm of torque, with a top speed of 202 mph (325 km/h).

The 2013 models gain a new front end sheet metal along with standard HID headlamps, along with a new LED tail light assembly. Performance changes include twin fuel pumps (a Mustang GT's single supply pump, twice over), larger fuel injectors, a grippier and larger-diameter clutch, a larger fan, a three-row intercooler (the previous car used a double-row unit), a beefed-up Tremec 6060 six-speed with an internal oil pump, and a single-piece carbon-fiber driveshaft. Larger Brembo front disc brakes with six-piston calipers, reinforced axle tubes, and aero tweaks to help the car reach 200+mph safely. Ford says the changes have resulted in a 14% reduction in drag and a 66% increase in front-end downforce. Also new for 2013 is a larger front anti-roll bar and retuned springs. An rpm-adjustable electronic launch-control function is standard, as is four-mode electronic stability control.

A Performance package is also offered, adding two-mode adjustable Bilstein dampers and a Torsen limited-slip rear differential. In addition to the performance package, a track package for road racing can be ordered bringing a transmission cooler, a nose-mounted differential cooler for the Torsen limited-slip unit, and an air-to-oil engine-oil cooler.

=== Engines ===
Model	Years	Power at rpm	Torque at rpm
Mustang (4.0 L V6)	2005–2010	210 hp (157 kW) at 5300	240 lb⋅ft (325 N⋅m) at 3500
Mustang (3.7 L V6)	2011–2014	305 hp (227 kW) at 6500	280 lb⋅ft (380 N⋅m) at 4250
Mustang GT (4.6 L V8)	2005–2009	300 hp (224 kW) at 5750	320 lb⋅ft (434 N⋅m) at 4500
Mustang GT (4.6 L V8)	2010	315 hp (235 kW) at 6000	325 lb⋅ft (441 N⋅m) at 4250
Mustang GT (5.0 L V8)	2011–2012	412 hp (307 kW) at 6500	390 lb⋅ft (529 N⋅m) at 4250
Mustang GT (5.0 L V8)	2013–2014	420 hp (313 kW) at 6500	390 lb⋅ft (529 N⋅m) at 4250
Shelby GT500 (5.4 L SC V8)	2010	540 hp (403 kW) at 6000	510 lb⋅ft (691 N⋅m) at 4800
Shelby GT500 (5.4 L SC V8)	2011–2012	550 hp (410 kW) at 6200	510 lb⋅ft (691 N⋅m) at 4250
Shelby GT500 (5.8 L SC V8)	2013–2014	662 hp (494 kW) at 6500	631 lb⋅ft (856 N⋅m) at 4000
Boss 302 (5.0 L V8)	2012–2013	444 hp (331 kW) at 7500	380 lb⋅ft (515 N⋅m) at 4250

=== Motorsports ===
Ten Mustangs were used in the SCCA World Challenge GTS Series.

Twelve Mustangs were used in the Continental Tire Sports Car Challenge Gran Sport class.

A Mustang resembling the Trans Am Series Mustang driven by Parnelli Jones was entered in the 2010 Continental Challenge, commemorating the fortieth anniversary of Parnelli's championship.

The Ford Mustang was used in the NASCAR Nationwide Series as a silhouette racing car beginning on July 2, 2010.

Mustangs have also been raced in the FIA GT3 and GT4 championships.

In 2012, Jack Roush won the Daytona International Speedway's opening race of the 50th Anniversary Rolex 24 At Daytona weekend in a Mustang Boss 302R. He led the Continental Tire SportsCar Challenge's final 18 laps, in front of six BMW M3's.

== Sales ==
Model year	US	Canada	Mexico	Europe
2005	160,975	10,045	2,253	745
2006	166,530	9,150	2,952	752
2007	134,626	7,987	2,052	602
2008	91,251	6,261	1,769	904
2009	66,623	5,200	1,655	511
2010	73,716	5,232	1,558	747
2011	70,438	4,433	1,272	994
2012	90,706	5,181	1,231	951
2013	77,186	5,054	926	635
2014	82,635	5,605	1,035	556
Total	1,014,686	64,148	16,703	7,394
