= Charles L. Sallée Jr =

American artist

Charles L. Sallée Jr.
- Born: 1913 (disputed), Oberlin, Ohio
- Died: 2006
- Education: Cleveland School of Art (Now Cleveland Institute of Art) Adelbert College of Western Reserve University Karamu House (formerly The Playhouse Settlement)

Charles L. Sallée Jr. (1913–2006) was an African-American artist from Cleveland, Ohio. He was the first African-American to graduate from the Cleveland School of Art. He was later commissioned as a WPA artist and muralist and also worked as an interior designer.

== Personal life ==
Charles L. Sallée was born in Oberlin, Ohio. Many publications list Sallée's birth year as 1913, while other publications have his birth year dated as earlier or later. His father was an ornamental plasterer who moved the family to Sandusky, Ohio, to pursue a career as a builder. Sallée attended Sandusky High School, where he studied art, specifically Renaissance Art and the work of notable 19th-century French artist Jean-Auguste-Dominique Ingres. While he attended school, he produced portrait drawings of the faculty and painted a mural at the school of Commodore Perry’s Battle of Lake Erie. In a 1995 interview, Sallée said he also helped create stage sets for plays at the school.

Sallée was married to Constance Waples, his second wife, from 1960 to 1990. They had three children, a son by the name of Warren and two daughters by the name of Coco and Renee. Sallée died in 2006.

== Education and artistic career ==
Education

In 1931, Sallée moved to Cleveland and began taking classes at Karamu House. A year later, Sallée was awarded the first Gilpin Scholarship, named after Charles Gilpin, an African-American Broadway actor who at one time donated $50 to Karamu House. Due in part to this scholarship, Sallée was able to attend the Cleveland School of Art (Cleveland Institute of Art) that year Sallée majored in portraiture under Rolf Stoll and minored in design under Kenneth Bates and Victor Schreckengost. He also studied painting under Carl Gaertner and Paul Travis. Many of Sallée's instructors at the Cleveland School of Art also taught at Karamu House. Between 1932 and 1933, Sallée also studied lithography and etching techniques at John Huntington Polytechnic Institute.

Sallée was also awarded the Gund Scholarship for Bertha, a portrait of a Karamu House dancer, which helped facilitate his fifth year of study at the Cleveland School of Art. The exact dates time of Sallée's graduations from Cleveland School of Art and Adelbert college of Western Reserve University are unclear. However, it is assumed Sallée completed his studies at both institutions between 1933 and 1938. At the Cleveland School of Art, Sallée was the first African-American student to graduate. He received a B.A. in education from Adelbert College of Western Reserve University.

Career as artist and teacher

After his studies, Sallée taught at Kennard and Outhwaite Junior High Schools, and Central High School, all in Cleveland. He later came to instruct at Karamu House, formerly known as the Playhouse Settlement. Sallée himself was mentored at Karamu House by Richard Beatty, head of the studio department and a printmaking instructor, along with other notable Cleveland artists such as Elmer Brown and Hughie-Lee Smith.

Lee-Smith and Sallée joined the WPA printmaking project at Karamu House with Zell Ingram and Fred Carlo. Sallée and other Karamu House artists were influenced and a part of several artistic movements. They had mainly subscribed to realist American themes, and were inspired by both the American Regionalists and the social realism of the Mexican Muralists. Sallée painted WPA murals, most of which are no longer extant. One of Sallée's murals that has since been destroyed was at the Portland Outhwaite Homes; it depicted the hopes of African-American families migrating to Cleveland.

Sallée was a prolific portraitist; however, some critics considered him to have been a better draftsman than painter. One of Sallée's noted portrait paintings is Girl with a Pink Geranium. The image of the young woman alongside the flower is meant to reflect both their beauties. Like some of his peers at Karamu House, Sallée tended to create empathetic representations of African-Americans, and his portrayal of the community in moments of leisure has a celebratory quality to it. Sallée also portrayed nightclub scenes in his works, which could be attributed to his involvement in Cleveland nightlife and work as an interior designer for clubs.

Sallée's works have appeared in several publications, including Alain Locke's The Negro in Art, James A. Porter's Modern Negro Art 1943 publication, Patterson's The Negro in Music and Art 1969 publication, and Walker's A Resource Guide to the Visual Arts of Afro-Americans 1971 publication.

In the 1930s, Sallée exhibited work at the May Show at Cleveland Museum of Art, an exhibit meant to present the best contemporary art in Cleveland. It was one of two competitive annual shows in the city.

Military and career as an interior designer

During World War II Sallée was sent to England by the Army Corps of Engineers. He was positioned as a technical sergeant and served as a cartographer and camouflage designer. During Liberation he was stationed in France, and finally ended his tour of duty in the Philippines.

After the war, Sallée received interior design commissions and became a charter member of the American Institute of American Designers. One of his biggest and best-known commissions is the renovation of a former restaurant on 105th Street in Cleveland. He converted the space into the Tijuana nightclub where he created a revolving stage for acts such as Nat “King” Cole to perform on. Sallée was also commissioned to design the Grand Ballroom and the Brasserie Restaurant at Stouffer's Inn on the Square (now the Renaissance Cleveland Hotel).

== Selected exhibitions ==
- 1937: Howard University
- 1937–39: May Show at Cleveland Museum of Art
- 1940: Negro Exposition of 1940
- 1940: Tanner Art Galleries of Chicago
- 1940: first solo exhibition backed by North Canton Library in North Canton, Ohio
- 1941: Southside Art Center of Chicago
- 1942: Atlanta University
- January 7–22, 1942: Associated Artists Gallery in New York: Negro Art from Cleveland’s Karamu House, hosted by Dorothy Maynor and Eleanor Roosevelt. The show was also presented at Temple University in Philadelphia between February 2–16, 1942.

== Selected works and collections ==
Work	Collection	Medium
Jumpin Jive	The Metropolitan Museum of Art	Etching
Almeda	The Metropolitan Museum of Art	Etching and aquatint
Wrecking Crew	The Metropolitan Museum of Art	Soft-ground etching
By Request	The Metropolitan Museum of Art	Etching
Cabaret Scene	The Metropolitan Museum of Art	Soft-ground etching
Bedtime	The Cleveland Museum of Art	Oil on canvas
Anna	The Cleveland Museum of Art	Etching and aquatint
Cheryl	The Cleveland Museum of Art	Brown chalk
Bertha	The Cleveland Museum of Art	Etching and aquatint
Swingtime	Saint Louis Art Museum	Etching and aquatint
Almeda	Akron Art Museum	Etching and aquatint on paper
Ermetta	Akron Art Museum	Etching on paper
Bertha	Akron Art Museum	Etching and aquatint on paper
Juke Box Jive	Karamu House Collection	Aquatint
Girl with a Pink Geranium	The Harmon and Harriet Kelley Collection of African-American Art	Oil on canvas
