= Burchfield =

Burchfield is a surname. Notable people with the surname include:

- Charles E. Burchfield (1893–1967), American watercolor painter, born in Ashtabula Harbor, Ohio
- Martha Burchfield (1924–1977), American watercolor painter, born in Buffalo, New York
- Robert Burchfield CNZM CBE (1923–2004), scholar, writer, and lexicographer

== Other uses ==
- Burchfield, West Virginia

== See also ==
- Burchfield-Penney Art Center, located on the campus of Buffalo State College, founded in 1966
