= John Paul Miller =

American jewellery designer and goldsmith

- Born: April 23, 1918; Huntingdon, Pennsylvania
- Died: March 1, 2013 (aged 94); Cleveland, Ohio
- Known for: Jewelry design, goldsmithing

John Paul Miller (April 23, 1918, Huntingdon, Pennsylvania – March 1, 2013, Cleveland, Ohio) was an American jewellery designer and goldsmith, who also produced films, photographs and paintings. Stephen Harrison, decorative arts curator at the Cleveland Museum of Art, compares Miller's work with that of René Lalique and Louis Comfort Tiffany.

== Biography ==
Miller's mother died when he was two, after which his family moved to Cleveland, where he attended Hough Elementary School and later Shaker Heights High School. He then enrolled in classes at the Cleveland Museum of Art following this with courses at the Cleveland School of Art where he studied enameling with Kenneth F. Bates (1904–1994). In 1936, he enrolled in the Cleveland School of Art's industrial design program.

Inspired by the silver jewellery of another student, Frederick A. Miller, John Paul set out to learn the techniques demanded by working with silver. He soon started creating rings and brooches using classical music and the natural world as inspiration. Some of his teachers greatly influenced his work: Paul Travis, Walter Sinz, Carl Gaertner and Viktor Schreckengost. John Paul later shared a studio and home with Fred Miller, his wife Mary and two children. After the death of Mary Miller in 1998 and Fred Miller in 2000, John Paul Miller continued living in the house, located south of Cleveland.

On his graduation in 1940, John Paul taught at the Cleveland School of Art for a year. His tour of duty with the Army at Fort Knox in Kentucky found him illustrating manuals on tank tactics. Shortly after resuming his position at the school in 1946, he discovered a document by an archaeologist at the American Academy in Rome on the ancient technique of granulation, a process which involves fixing minute gold beads to a gold surface without using any form of solder, thereby creating a finely textured coruscating surface. The paper was sufficient to guide Miller in the right direction - gold in the presence of copper lowers the melting point of both metals. By allowing copper to oxidise on the surface of gold globules, Miller rediscovered the ancient process making possible the fashioning of intricate designs.

Cehalopod pendant 1985-86, gold and enamel

His work drew great attention at the Designer Craftsman U.S.A. show of 1953, displays at the Art Institute of Chicago in 1957, New York’s Museum of Contemporary Crafts in 1964, international acclaim at the Brussels World's Fair, the Objects: USA traveling exhibition of 1969-1972, the Museum Bellerive in Zurich (1971), the Vatican Exhibition of American Crafts, and the Great Jewelry of the Ages exhibition at the Victoria and Albert Museum in London.

His work is on permanent display at the Cleveland Museum of Art, the Renwick Gallery of the Smithsonian Institution, the Museum of Contemporary Crafts in New York City, the Minnesota Museum of American Art in St. Paul, Vassar College, Yale University, and the Fleischman Collection. Despite all this exposure, fame arrived belatedly for Miller at 92 years of age, when curator Stephen Harrison arranged a 2010 retrospective of his work at the Cleveland Museum of Art.

At once an artist, teacher, and craftsman, John Paul Miller personifies a lifetime of creative expression. The Cleveland Museum of Art celebrates this living legend and master goldsmith in an exhibition installation of more than 50 of his incredible works, including sketchbooks and drawings, spanning nearly 60 years of his illustrious career. His two greatest passions—music and art—seemingly converge in work that moves from poetic forms to intensely intricate compositions. His earliest creations are lyrically simple, biomorphic forms characteristic of the modern era. Miller's fascination with technique and process emerged in his groundbreaking rediscovery in the early 1950s of granulation, an ancient, yet forgotten, way of fusing tiny gold beads to a gold surface without solder. The fleeting creatures of earth, sea, and sky—snails, squids, crabs, moths, and flies—became his muse, inspiring a complicated palette of seductive enamels and textured forms. Historical reference and modern abstraction also infuse his designs, bringing together that which he saw and that which he imagined to form a body of work full of curiosity and self-expression.

— Cleveland Museum of Art

Miller was an experienced hiker and outdoorsman who enjoyed hiking trips in the Rocky Mountains and the Tetons.

== Awards ==
In 1961, Miller was awarded the first Cleveland Arts Prize in the visual arts. That same year, his work was shown at an international exhibition at London’s Goldsmiths' Hall. In 1994, the American Craft Council awarded him their gold medal.
