= Cleveland Institute of Art =

Art school in Cleveland, Ohio, US

Coordinates: 41°30′37.7″N 81°36′8.91″W

- Former names: Western Reserve School of Design for Women (1882–1892), Cleveland School of Art (1892–1949)
- Type: Private
- Established: 1882; 144 years ago
- President: Kathryn J. Heidemann
- Faculty: 50 Full-time faculty, 60 adjunct faculty (2021–22)
- Undergraduates: 580 (figures from Fall 2021)
- Location: Cleveland, Ohio
- Campus: Urban
- Website: www.cia.edu

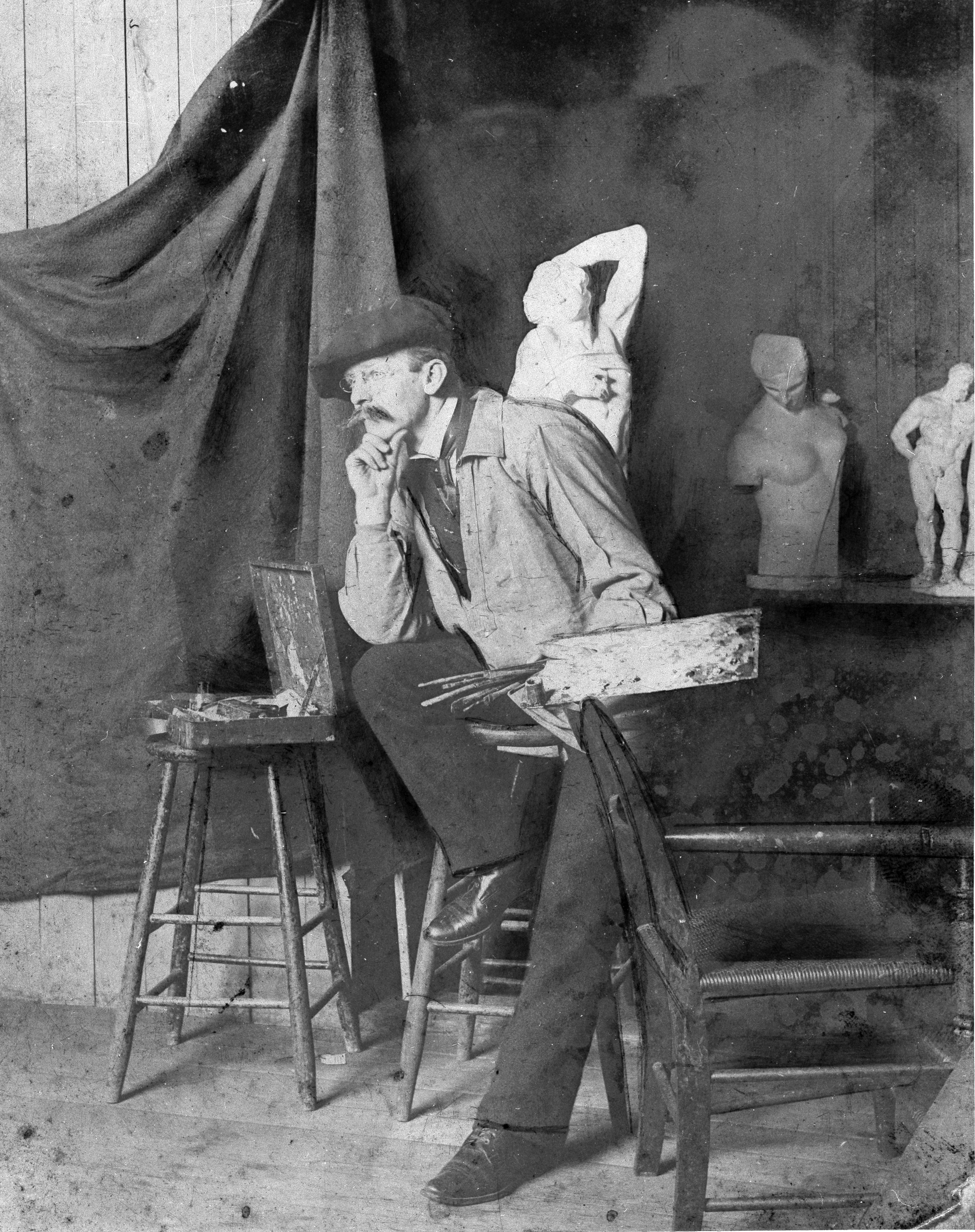
Frederick Gottwald taught at the Western Reserve School of Design for Women, and it has been said that he "contributed more than any other person to Cleveland's artistic development".

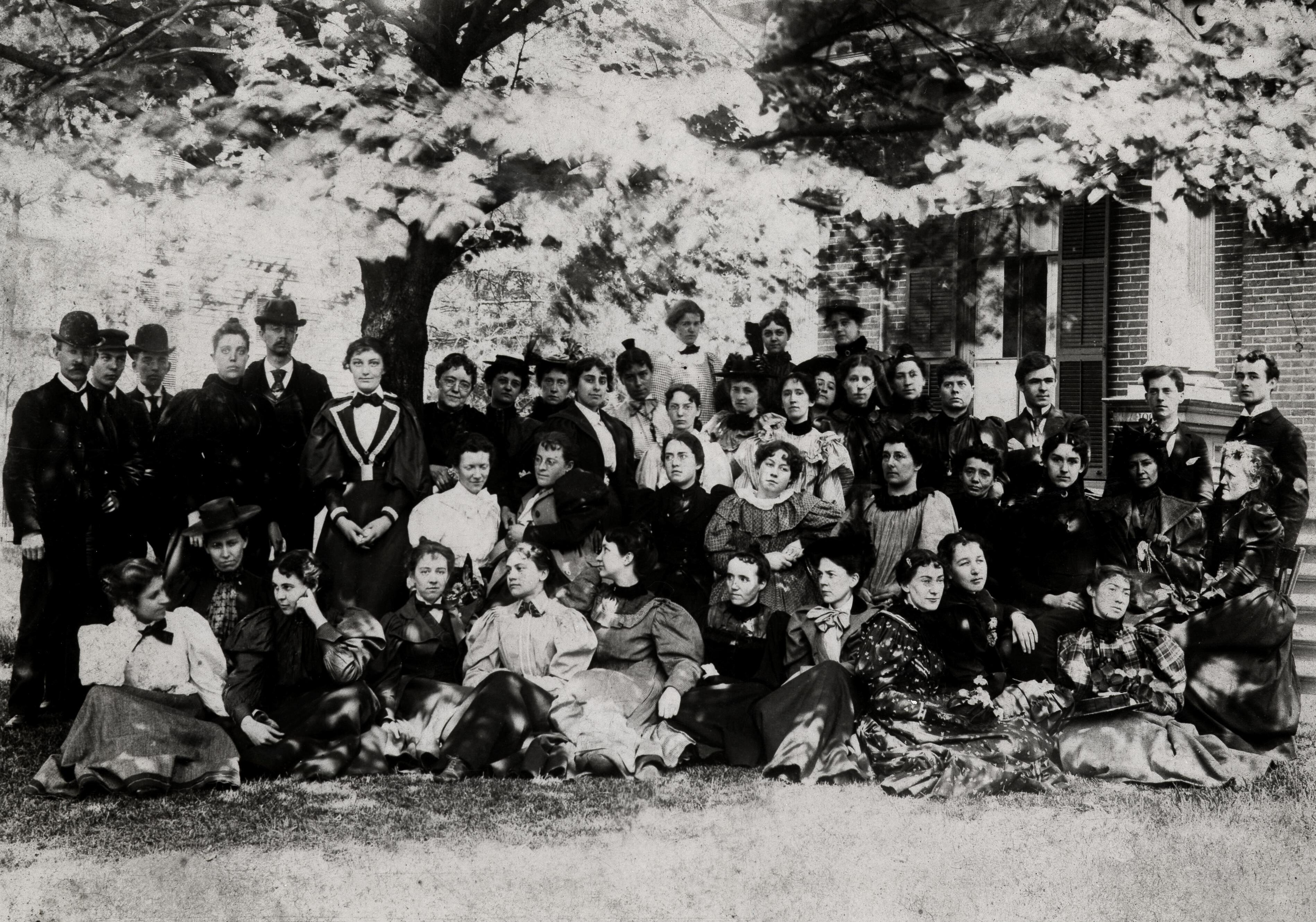
Cleveland Institute of Art, c. 1900.

The Cleveland Institute of Art, previously Cleveland School of Art, is a private college focused on art and design and located in Cleveland, Ohio, United States.

== History ==
The college was founded in 1882 as the Western Reserve School of Design for Women, at first attended by one teacher and one pupil in the sitting room of its founder, Sarah Kimball.

The school moved several times, first to the attic of the Old Cleveland City Hall, then to the Old Kelly homestead on Wilson Avenue (now East 55th Street).

Having become a co-educational school, it was renamed the Cleveland School of Art in 1892. After unsuccessful attempts to merge the school with Western Reserve University, the school became independent. In the fall of 1905, the first classes were held in a newly constructed building at the corner of Magnolia Drive and Juniper Road in Cleveland's University Circle. Beginning in 1917, the school offered classes for children and adults on weekends and in the summer.

The school participated in the WPA Federal Art Project during the Great Depression (1930s). Medical drawing and mapmaking were added to the curriculum during World War II (1939–1945).

The school began offering a Bachelor of Fine Arts degree in 1947 and it officially became the Cleveland Institute of Art in 1949. The college gradually incorporated more academic courses into the curriculum, while retaining its key objective to offer practical training.

In 1956 the school moved to a new building at 11141 East Boulevard that it would name for George Gund II, who served as the college's board president and generous patron from 1942 to 1966. In 1981, the college acquired the former Albert Kahn-designed Euclid Avenue assembly plant which was built by Ford in 1914-1915 and added to the National Register of Historic Places in 1976. Cleveland Institute of Art named the building the Joseph McCullough Center For Visual Arts following remodeling.

In early 2013, CIA announced it would sell its East Boulevard building to the Cleveland Museum of Art and Case Western Reserve University. In 2015, the college unified its operations at the Euclid Avenue site, where it completed construction of an 80,000-square-foot building adjoined to the McCullough Center on the west, and also named for George Gund II.

This new George Gund Building has been designed to look crisp and contemporary without detracting from the historic McCullough building next door. It houses:

- the Peter B. Lewis Theater, the new home of CIA's year-round, nationally acclaimed Cinematheque film program
- the Reinberger Gallery for public exhibitions;
- CIA's programs in Animation, Ceramics, Drawing, Game Design, Glass, Graphic Design, Illustration, Industrial Design, Interior Architecture, Jewelry + Metals, Life Sciences Illustration, Painting, Photography + Video, Printmaking, and Sculpture + Expanded Media
- the American Greetings Welcome Center
- the Admissions and Financial Aid offices
- administrative operations

This campus unification fully connects CIA to the new Uptown development of retail, restaurants, and residential construction anchored by CIA to the east and the new home of the Museum of Contemporary Art Cleveland to the west. Uptown Phase II, at the corner of Euclid Avenue and Ford Drive, includes CIA's new freshman residence hall that opened in August 2014.

== Academics ==
The institute offers a Bachelor of Fine Arts in many majors as well as study abroad programs, mobility programs, and internships. Services for students include Career Services and Center for Writing and Learning Support.

Other academic programs include:

- Continuing Education
- Pre-College Programs
- Summer Workshops
- Young Artist Programs

== Accreditation ==
The school is accredited by the North Central Association of Colleges and Schools (NCA) and the National Association of Schools of Art and Design (NASAD).

== Rankings ==
In 2020, Cleveland Institute of Art was named a Best Midwestern College by the Princeton Review. In 2015, CIA was the only college of art and design to achieve this designation. Princeton Review is an education services company widely known for its test preparation programs and college and graduate school guides.

In 2018–19, Money magazine named Cleveland Institute of Art to its "Best Colleges for your Money" ranking.

== Facilities ==
- Cleveland Cinematheque, a nationally recognized alternative film theater, is part of Cleveland Institute of Art.
- The recently completed (2015) George Gund Building adjoins the historic Joseph McCullough Center for the Visual Arts at 11610 Euclid Avenue.
- Reinberger Gallery presents free rotating art exhibits, events and lectures. Visiting artists often present lectures and symposia. The gallery is closed on Sundays.
- CIA's Uptown Residence Hall houses some 130 first-year students in the Uptown Development on Euclid Avenue.
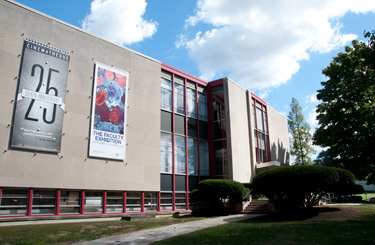
Cleveland Institute of Art's (old) George Gund Building

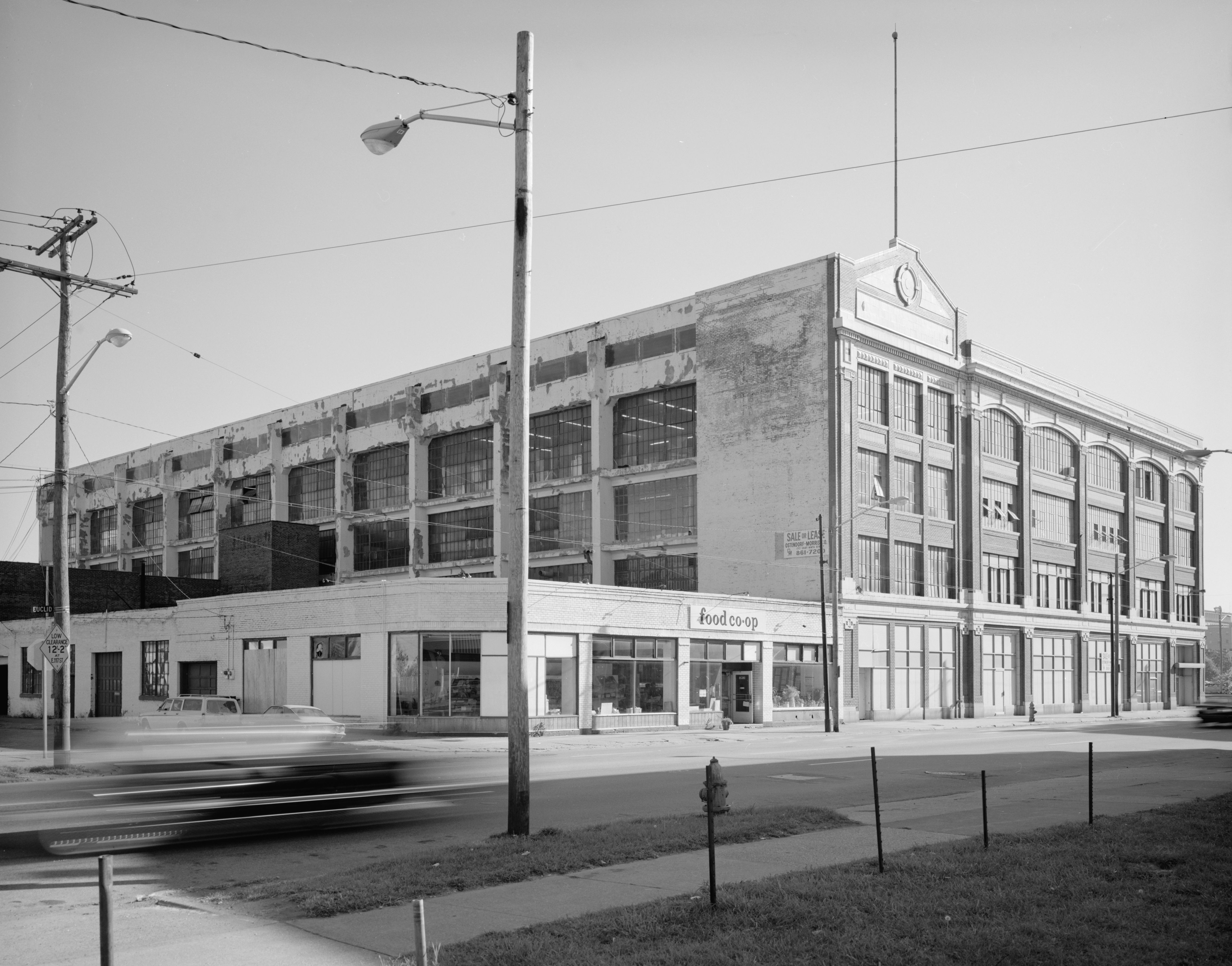
The institute's McCullough Center is a former Ford Model T factory at Euclid Avenue and East 116th Street

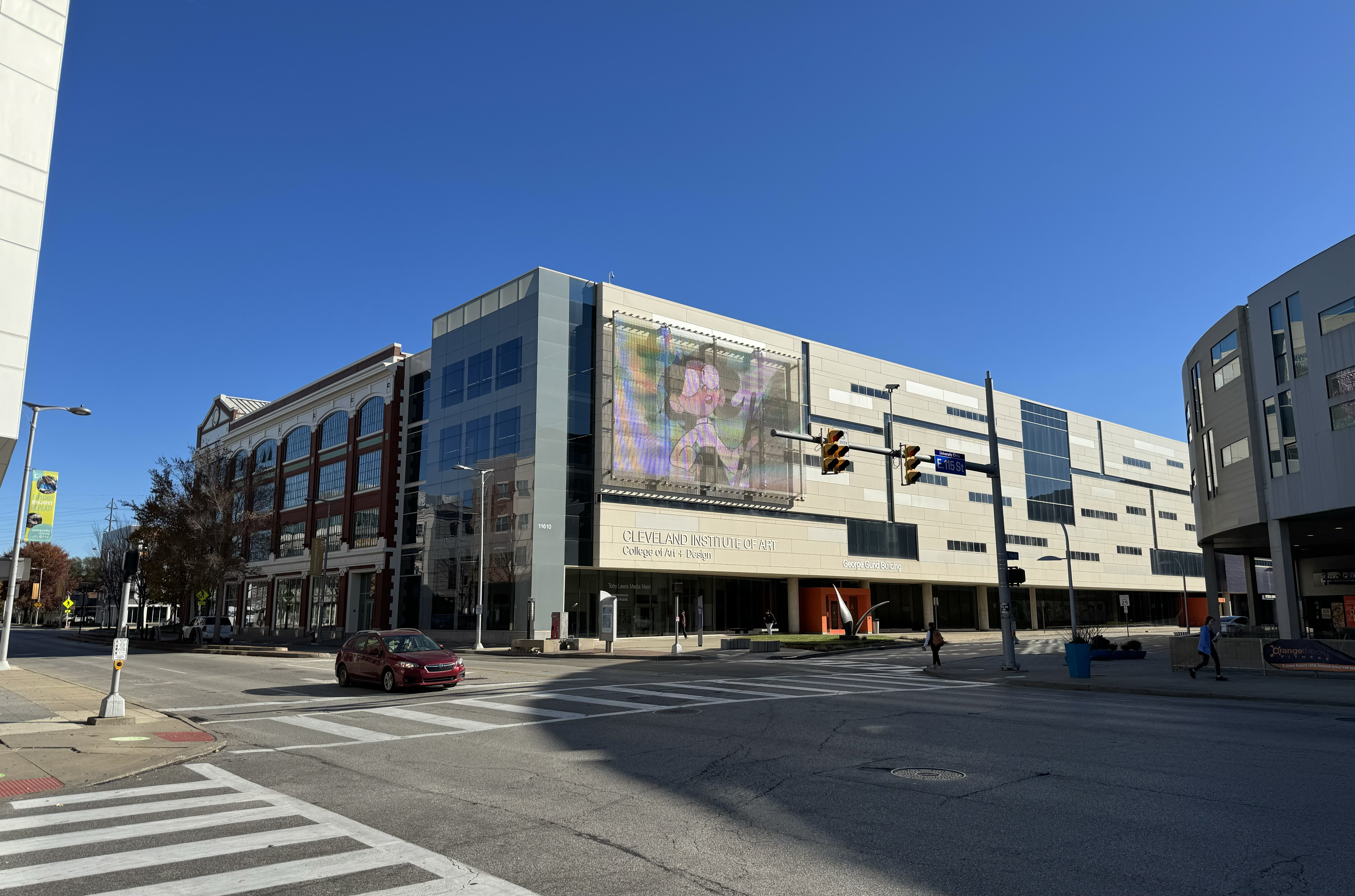
Cleveland Institute of Art on Euclid Ave modern day

== Notable professors and students ==
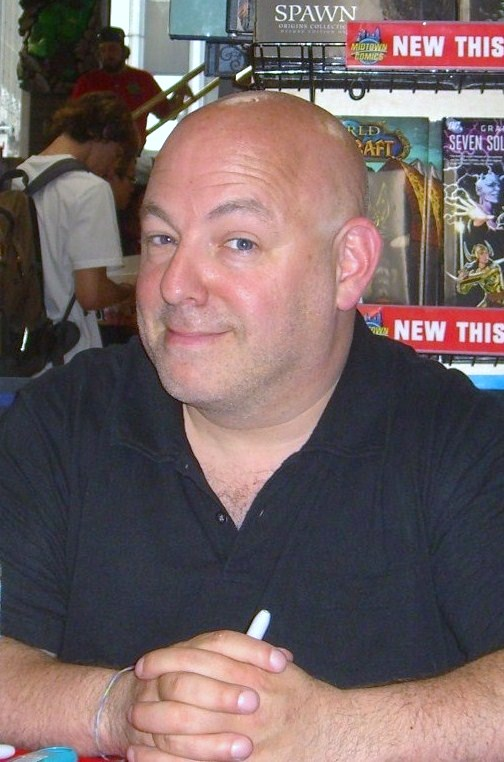
Brian Michael Bendis (CIA class of 1991), Marvel Comics and DC Comics comic book writer and artist, known for Ultimate Spider-Man and the Ultimate Marvel Universe.

- Shelby Lee Adams, photographer
- Richard Anuszkiewicz, painter
- Robert Banks, filmmaker
- Brian Michael Bendis, comic book artist, writer of Ultimate Spider-Man
- Samuel Bookatz, artist
- Brian Bram, artist for American Splendor
- Marc Brown, creator of the popular children's books and animated series Arthur.
- Charles Burchfield, painter
- Martha Burchfield, painter
- Ray Burggraf, artist and color theorist, professor
- Charles Cajori, painter, professor
- Shirley Aley Campbell, painter
- Mario Casilli, celebrity photographer
- Susan Collett, printmaker and ceramic sculptor
- Scott Colosimo, entrepreneur and motorcycle designer
- Barbara Cooper, sculptor
- Clarence Carter, painter
- Stevan Dohanos, illustrator
- Clara Driscoll
- Edris Eckhardt
- Jurgen Faust, design professor
- Marshall Fredericks, sculptor
- Carl Gaertner
- April Gornik, painter
- Shan Goshorn, basketmaker and silversmith
- Sante Graziani, academic educator, lecturer, artist and teacher
- William Harper, metals/enameling artist
- Jerry Hirshberg
- Max Kalish
- Bob Paul Kane, painter
- Henry Keller
- James C. Kulhanek, Federal Art Project artist
- Hughie Lee-Smith, artist and teacher
- Winifred Ann Lutz
- Robert Mangold, painter
- Leza McVey
- William McVey, sculptor
- John Paul Miller, metals artist
- Ryan Nagode, chief designer, Chrysler
- Onya Nurve, drag queen
- John Opper, painter
- Joe Oros, automotive designer
- Betty Thatcher Oros, America's first female automotive designer.
- Charles L. Sallée Jr, painter, printmaker, muralist
- Viktor Schreckengost, industrial designer, sculptor, painter
- Dana Schutz, painter
- Jenny Scobel, painter
- Walter Sinz, designer of the Thompson Trophy and teacher at the school from 1911 to 1952
- Julian Stanczak, painter
- Eric Stoddard, designer of the Chrysler Crossfire and Hyundai Genesis Coupe
- Judy Takács, painter
- Toshiko Takaezu, American ceramic artist
- Paul Timman, prominent American tattoo artist and tableware designer
- Paul Travis, painter
- Luella Varney, sculptor
- Frank N. Wilcox, painter, illustrator
- Thaddeus Wolfe, designer and artist
- Harold Zisla, painter
