= Bob Paul Kane =

American painter

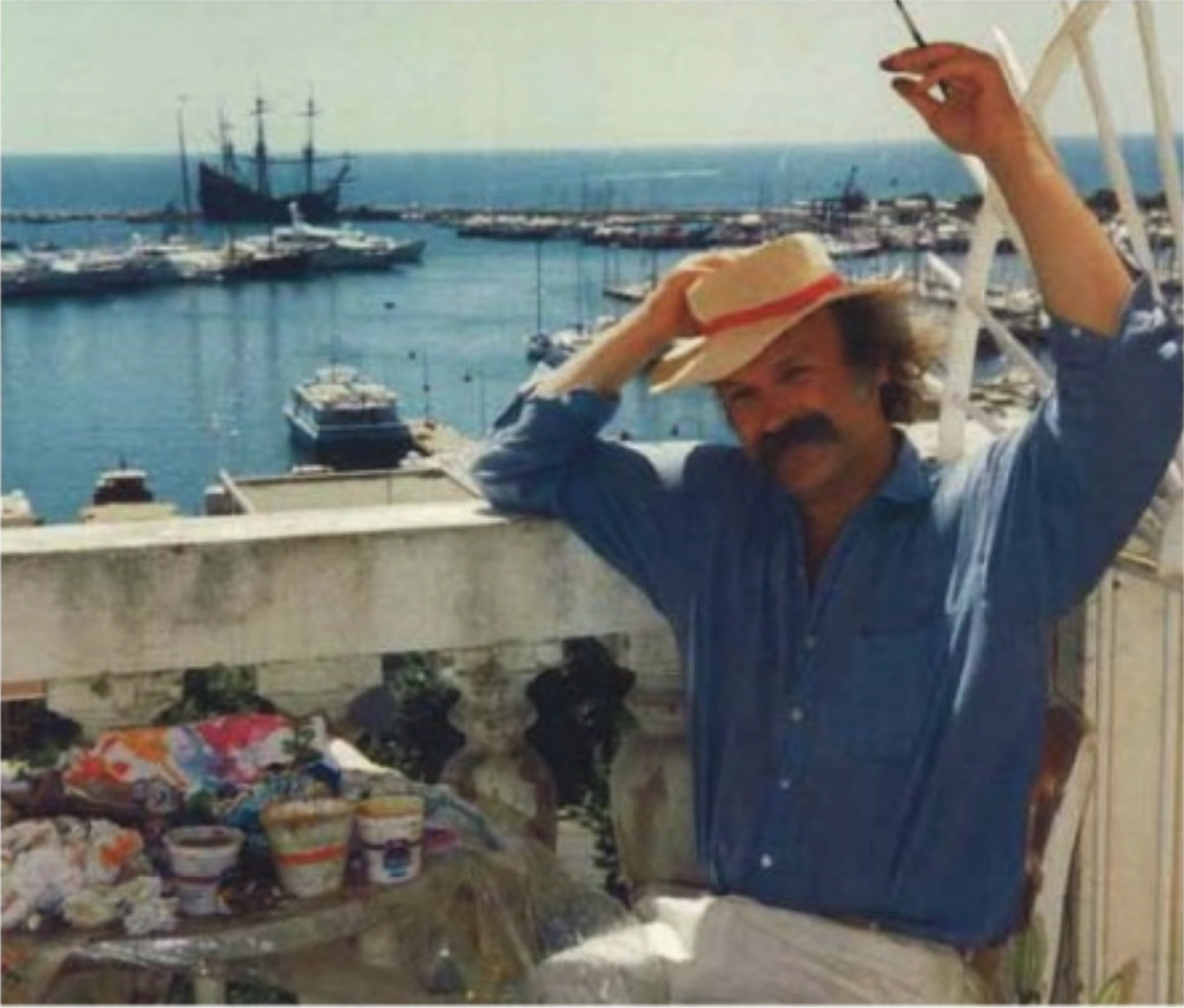
Kane in an undated photo

Bob Paul Kane (1937 – 2013) was an American painter known for his gestural style, vibrant colors, and festive subject matter.

== Early life and education ==
Kane was born in Cleveland, Ohio. As a child he attended the Cleveland Museum School, where he was exposed to drawing and painting; and later the Cleveland Institute of Art in 1953–54. In 1955 he enrolled at Cornell University, but left a year later to pursue painting, heading to Provincetown, Massachusetts, where he met sculptor Chaim Gross. They developed a close relationship, and Kane returned with the Gross family to New York in the fall of 1956. At Gross’ encouragement, he studied at the Art Students League of New York, and accepted a one-year scholarship to Pratt Institute in 1958.

At the Art Students League, Kane studied with George Grosz, and with Will Barnet, who became one of his greatest influences. Barnet’s class was where Kane met Belgian student Eva Marie Honigman in 1961, whom he married three years later. Her work as a textile designer, with its bold sense of color and design, inspired him. “She is by far the greatest influence on me," Kane said. "When I first met her, her French feeling for gaiety impressed me and has become a major part of my work.”

== Artistic style ==
Kane is known for his synthesis of a colorful impressionist palette with a decidedly American sensibility. His works are full of lively brushwork and spontaneity, described by critic Richard J. Boyle as a “fast and furious style of painting.” MoMA Curator John Elderfield notes that Kane’s paintings “look back through Philip Guston’s coloration and seek to pursue the brightness and freedom associated with Henri Matisse’s palette.”

From Will Barnet, Kane learned structure and control of space and depth, but his most quintessential passion was for color. Barnet says of Kane: "The very first time I saw Bob Kane's work, I recognized his unique talent. His painting had an energy and an explosive force. This combined with an underlined passion for nature in all its elements has dominated his work throughout his career.”

Kane was inspired by his visits to beach towns in the Mediterranean, where he soaked up sensuous subject matter with intense light and color. He often painted with watercolors on location, then produced oil paintings back in his New York studio. On painting en plein air, Kane says, “I have been lucky in my studios. My one in Rome was a café across from the Pantheon, and in Venice a gondoliere offered me his gondola when he was not using it.”

His travels took him to France, Italy, Spain, Greece, and Morocco, specifically cities such as Nice, Positano, Naples, Cannes, and Venice. Visits to Nice’s Marché aux Fleurs, for instance, inspired his flower still lifes.

On his approach, Kane says, “I have tried to eliminate a vase sitting on a table, but rather make the flowers surround you as in a garden yet maintaining the logic of the picture plane and structure, and this concept is with me in all my compositions. The problem for the figurative painter, I believe, is to capture the wildness of abstraction and use it to give life to the objects he loves.”

== Popularity ==
Kane enjoyed great popularity among actors. Provincetown in the late 1960s was a hub for artists and theater people. It was there he met some actors who later collected his work, including Frederic Kimball.

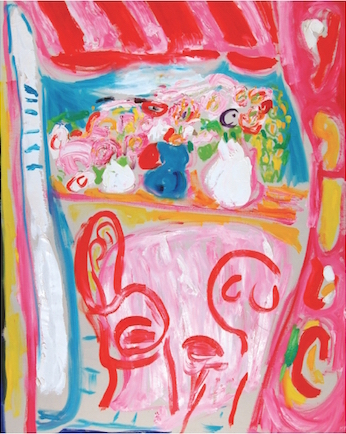
Painting by Bob Paul Kane

Many of his works were acquired by Connie and Jerry Wald, the film producer. Connie Wald was one of his staunchest supporters, introducing his work to many of her friends in the film world, and establishing Kane in California. She introduced Bob's work to Audrey Hepburn, with whom Kane developed a lifelong friendship, and who acquired a large collection of Kane's paintings. Her son, Sean Hepburn Ferrer, said that Audrey loved Bob's work and owned 20 of his paintings. Audrey Hepburn wrote to Kane on January 30, 1973: "I am permanently indebted to you for all of the gaiety you have brought to our house." Around this time in the early 1970s, Kane also met other actors such as Jill Clayburgh, Al Pacino, and later Brian Cox, Irina Brook and Faye Grant, who also acquired his work. Other celebrity collectors include Jamie Lee Curtis and Mary Tyler Moore. Paul Benedict also bought many of Kane’s paintings as gifts for theater friends and wedding presents.

In 1970, Joseph Hishhorn of the Hirshhorn Museum and Sculpture Garden bought Kane’s paintings of Vence, home of Matisse near the end of his life. Also a major art collector, his wife Olga Hirschhorn became a Kane supporter: "Joe Hirshhorn introduced me to Bob Kane's work in the early sixties. Joe was expanding his art collection and I was starting mine. Kane’s paintings reflect his love of Italy, France, and Spain as he returns each year to portray intimate scenes of everyday activity. Vibrant, warm colors dominate his palette, as they display his love for life, people, and friendly places. Capturing scenes of local color most people might miss, his titles reflect his eye for diverse interest."

Edward Broida was also one of Kane’s most important collectors, and was known for his adventurous, independent-minded collection, much of which he donated to New York's Museum of Modern Art in 2005.

== Exhibitions ==
Kane presented solo exhibitions at Bertha Schaefer Gallery in New York, Ankrum Gallery in Los Angeles, Galerie Marcel Bernheim in Paris, the Musée de St. Paul de Vence in France, the American Embassy in Tokyo, Japan and Berne, Switzerland. He began working with Harmon-Meek Gallery in Naples, Florida in 1987 at the suggestion of Will Barnet. "Barnet has had thousands of students since the early 1950s, and yet Kane was the only one he ever recommended to join him as a gallery artist at this gallery, the gallery he has been associated with since 1970." Kane has had 25 exhibitions there since 1989.

Hollis Taggart Gallery in New York presented a solo exhibition of Kane’s work, “Journey into Color”, in 2006.

His works are included in more than 30 museums' permanent collections. The most recent inclusions were at the Museum of Modern Art in New York (2011) and the Orlando Museum of Art in Florida (2012).
