= Thaddeus Wolfe =

American designer and artist (born 1979)

Thaddeus Wolfe (born 1979) is an American designer and artist, known for his glass vessels, light fixtures, and wall-bound pieces made through a "unique molding process that combines one-of-a-kind plaster casts and expert glassblowing". His glasswork is multi-layered and highly textured, often incorporating brass and bronze. In 2016, Wolfe was awarded the Rakow Commission given every year by the Corning Museum of Glass. Wolfe lives and works in Brooklyn, New York.

== Early life and education ==
Wolfe was born and raised in Toledo, Ohio, a town known for its glass-rich culture. He studied art and design with a focus in glass at the Cleveland Institute of Art where he received a BFA in 2002. After graduation, he moved to New York City where he apprentice with several notable glass artist, including Jeff Zimmerman and Josiah McElheny. He established his own studio practice in 2009.

== Career ==
Wolfe's began using clay as his original molding material but then started using Styrofoam which allows him to make more dimensional, dynamic, and angular constructions. His work uses traditional glassmaking techniques but his sculptures often don't end up looking like they are made of glass.

In his work, he incorporates human-made and organic structures: "I am interested in the organic deterioration of surfaces in my urban surroundings, Czech cubism, visual complexity in simple repeated structures in minerals, plants, and other natural phenomena, and recently poroid patterns in certain bracket-fungi (the undersides of shelf-like mushrooms). My goal is a synthesis of visual input/ideas from the natural and unnatural worlds into something more complex and abstract which does not necessarily reference any one specific thing".

His work has been exhibited at Corning Museum of Glass, E.R. Butler and Co., Museum of Craft and Design in San Francisco, Heller Gallery, R & Company, Matter, The South Street Seaport Museum, Volume Gallery, and Pierre Marie Giraud. He is represented by Volume gallery in Chicago and Pierre Marie Giraud in Brussels. His work has been collected at Musée des Arts Decoratifs de Montréal, Montréal, Québec, Corning Museum of Glass, Corning, NY, Indianapolis Museum of Art, Indianapolis, IN, RISD Museum, Providence, RI.
