= July Reflections =

1972 painting by Martha Burchfield

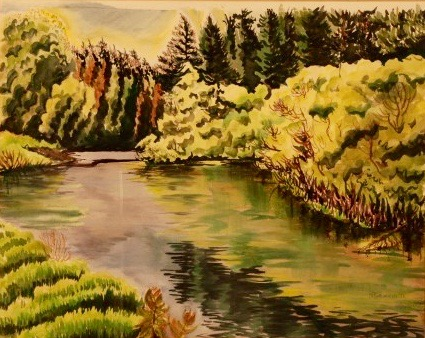
- Artist: Martha Burchfield
- Year: 1972
- Type: Watercolor
- Dimensions: 18 7/8 x 24 in.
- Location: Burchfield Penny Art Center, Buffalo
- Website: Martha Burchfield Richter (1924-1977): Memorial Tribute

July Reflections is a watercolor on seamed paper by Martha Burchfield that she made in 1972 in Buffalo, New York based on a pencil sketch.
