= Dale Kennington =

American painter

- Born: January 24, 1935; Savannah, Georgia, United States
- Died: May 2, 2017 (aged 82)
- Education: University of Alabama
- Known for: Painting
- Movement: New American Realism
- Awards: Governor's Arts Award

Dale Wilson Kennington (January 24, 1935 – May 2, 2017) was a Contemporary Artist working in the style of New American Realism.

== Life ==
Kennington was born in Savannah, Georgia and lived most of her life in Dothan, Alabama. She received a B.A. in Art History and Design in 1956 from the University of Alabama in Tuscaloosa, Alabama. She also married her husband, Don Kennington, in the same year. In her early 40s she studied portraits because she wanted to have portraits of her children. She practiced by creating portraits of local children, developing a client list with the parents of her models. In the mid-1980s she gave up portraiture-for-hire work and moved to studio work. She has received numerous accolades and awards for her work. In 2009, she was recognized by the Alabama State Council on the Arts with the Governor's Arts Award, and the Alabama Bureau of Tourism and Travel as one of Alabama's "Master Artists".

== Works ==
Her imagery is often of anonymous, passive individuals engaged in the banal, idle activities of everyday life: riding the subway, people watching or sitting at a bar. Kennington refers to these repetitive moments as rituals that contribute to the shared condition of humanity, ultimately elevating them to the status of myths. The settings of her paintings appear as sober theatrical stages into which anyone could recognize herself.

Kennington later moved to painting folding screens after her husband's death. In these works she returned to her abstract roots, emphasizing shape and light and expanding upon the spatial complexities introduced in earlier series. Kennington's work is included in numerous public and private collections including the Montgomery Museum of Fine Arts, Montgomery, Alabama, the Columbus Museum of Art, Columbus, Georgia, the Wiregrass Museum of Art, Dothan, Alabama, and the Paul and Lulu Hilliard University Art Museum at the University of Louisiana, Lafayette, Louisiana.
