= Ray Burggraf =

American artist (born 1938)

Ray L. Burggraf
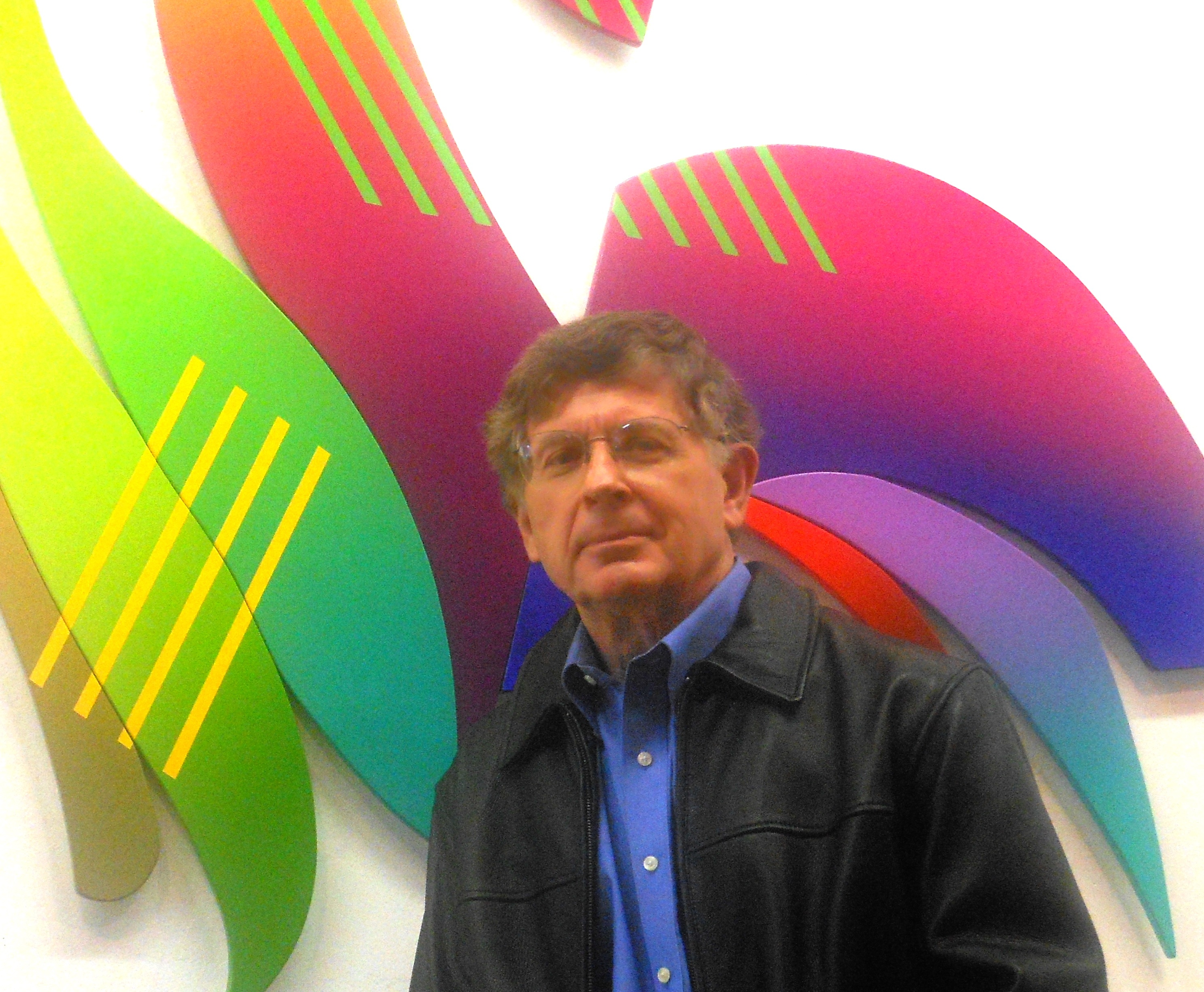
- Ray L. Burggraf at his studio in Tallahassee. In the background: Jungle Botanical, 2013.
- Born: Ray Lowell Burggraf; July 26, 1938 (age 88); Mt. Gilead, Ohio
- Education: University of California, Berkeley, Cleveland Institute of Art, Ashland University.
- Known for: Painter
- Spouse: Dr. Shirley P. Burggraf

Ray L. Burggraf (born 1938) is an artist, color theorist, and Emeritus Professor of Fine Arts at Florida State University. According to Roald Nasgaard, Burggraf's paintings exhibit "visual excitation...pulsating patterns, vibrating after-images, weird illusionistic spaces, multifocal opticality, executed with knife-edge precision...crisp and elegant and radiant with light." From a historical perspective, Burggraf's work is "nature evocative...reach[ing] back to the modernist landscape tradition of the Impressionists and of Neo-impressionists like Seurat, who, in the late-nineteenth century immersed themselves in the color theories of Chevreul and Rood" (Roald Nasgaard; former Chief Curator, Art Gallery of Ontario, 2006).

Using acrylic paint and wood—and sometimes Plexiglas and UV light—Burggraf frequently calls his paintings "color constructions", and they have been exhibited in the United States, Sweden, and Korea.

In 1981, Burggraf became a founding member of the non-profit 621 Gallery in Tallahassee, FL, and served as its first President. In 2004, Burggraf collaborated with two other Florida State University faculty members in the creation of an exhibition called, A Mysterious Clarity. The show debuted at the 621 Gallery, and by popular demand, evolved into a traveling exhibition. It has been viewed by the public in at least nine different museums and galleries, including the Brevard Art Museum of Melbourne, FL. Ray Burggraf's work demonstrates an extreme attention to technique, and has brought the role of environmentally-focused artwork to the forefront of debate among scholars (as reviewed by Kang, J.'s 2010 doctoral dissertation).

== Life and career ==
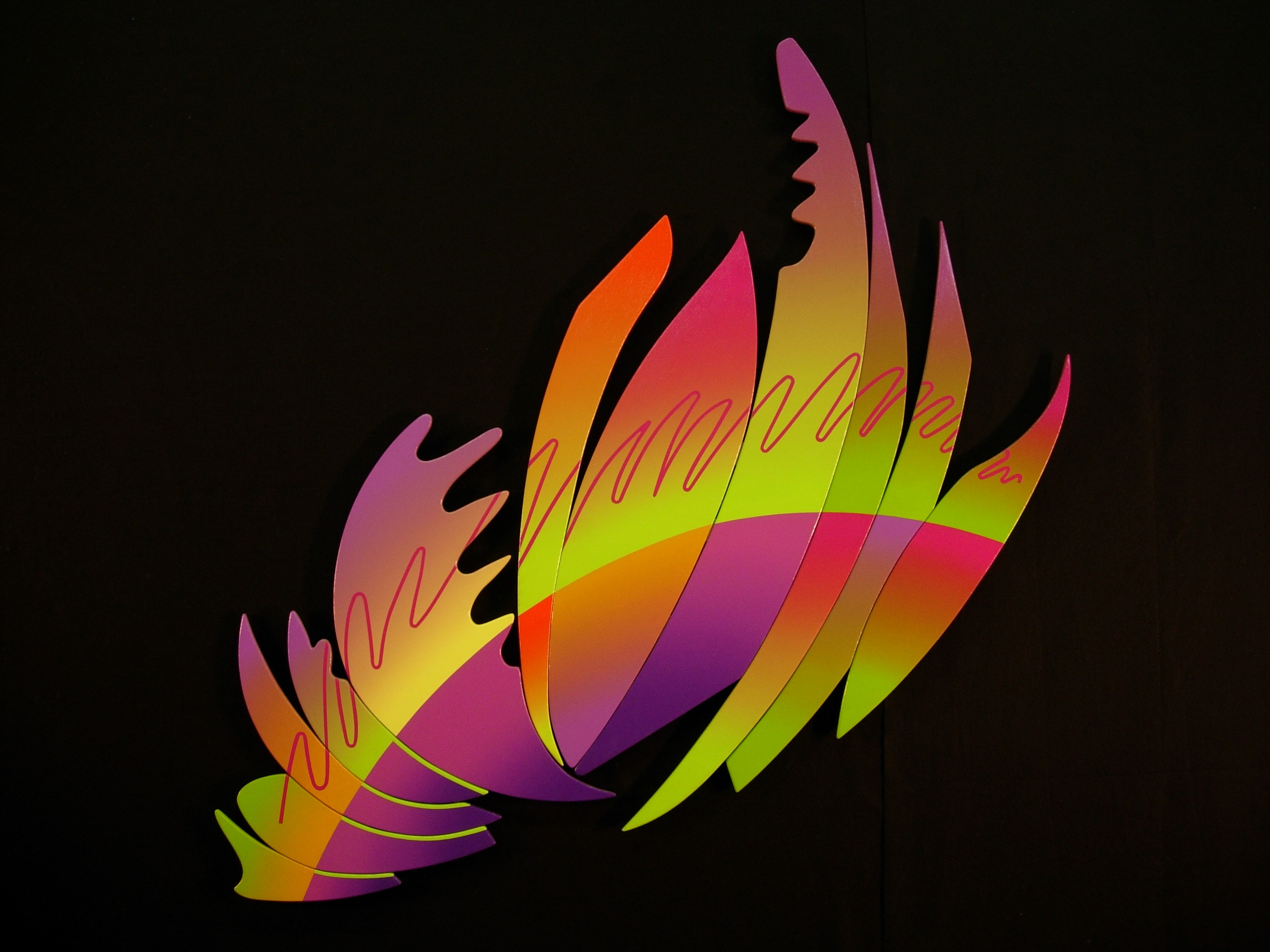
Dragon Breath. Acrylic paint on wood. 77 x 78 inches (painting by Ray L. Burggraf, 2000)

Burggraf was born in Ohio in 1938. He obtained a BS at Ashland University in 1961; a BFA from the Cleveland Institute of Art in 1968; and an MFA from The University of California at Berkeley in 1970.

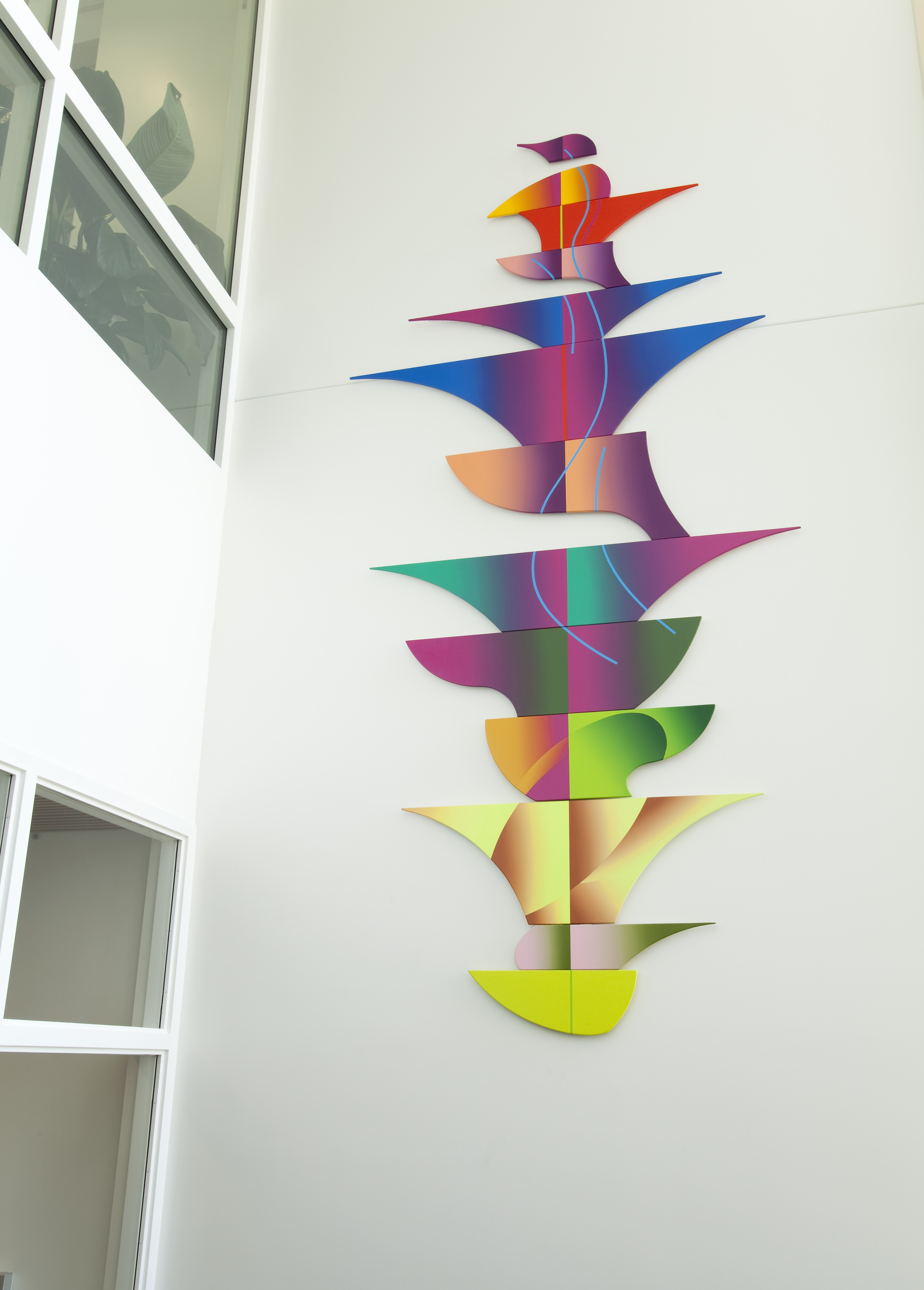
Sailboat Disguise in the auditorium lobby of the Student Wellness Center at Florida State University. Acrylic paint on wood. 12' tall. (Painting by Ray L. Burggraf, 2012)

In a statement published in 2010, Burggraf wrote that his observations regarding the industrialization of his hometown farming community served as the impetus for his drive to become an artist. After graduating from Ashland University, he worked as a teacher between 1961 and 1965.

Eventually Burggraf decided to create and paint full-time, and quit his job in order to enroll in the Cleveland Institute of Art. As a student, Burggraf embraced traditional studio practice and was inspired by the German Bauhaus of the 1930s, as well as the Op Art movement of the 1960s. After graduation in 1968, Burggraf moved to CA and began graduate studies in the Fine Arts at the University of California at Berkeley.

Burggraf graduated from UC Berkeley in 1970, and immediately moved to Tallahassee, FL to join the faculty at Florida State University. While at FSU, he spent the next 37 years teaching, painting and sculpting. In 2007, Burggraf retired from teaching and turned his focus to studio work. Today, Burggraf continues to paint and sculpt at the Ray Burggraf Studio, and teaches visiting college students in his capacity as Emeritus Professor of Fine Arts at FSU.

== About his work ==
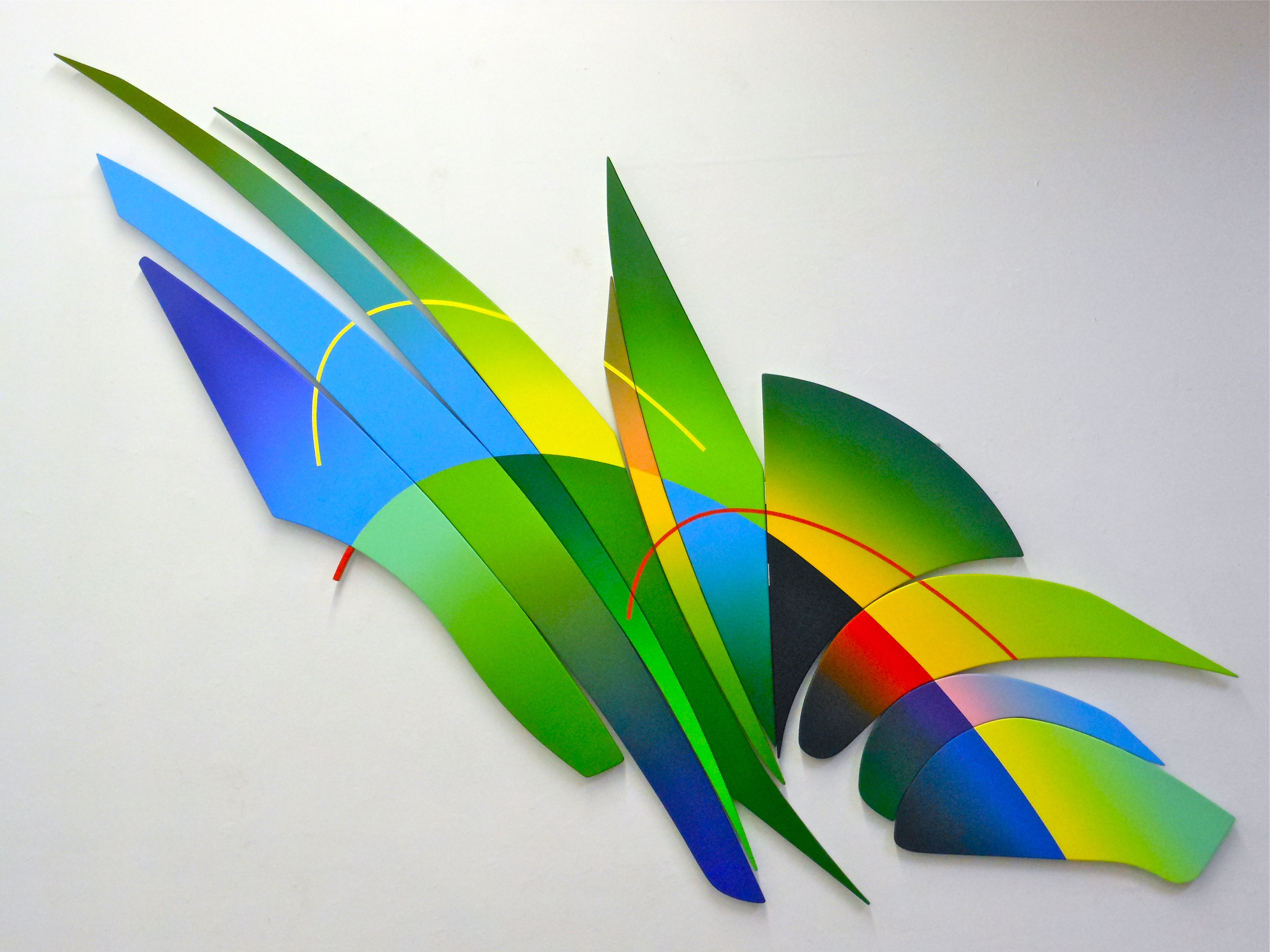
"Jungle Arc" by Burggraf. Acrylic paint on wood. (1998)

The precise color gradations in Ray Burggraf's paintings are frequently mistaken as having been created by airbrush. In fact, Burggraf creates the distinctive coloring by brushing acrylic paints by hand, using a specialized technique of Burggraf's invention. According to Ray Burggraf: Retrospective, by Roald Naasgard (2006), Burggraf describes the process of creating his color constructions as "a combination of an act of meditation and physically exacting exercise." The paintwork must be completed quickly, and precisely, because acrylics can dry in minutes.

Burggraf's earliest professional works, beginning around 1970, were primarily constructed on canvas. In the early 1980s, Burggraf transitioned to hand-crafted clusters of wood panels for the foundation of his color constructions. The panels allow Burggraf to add the dimension of time: moments in a day or week, and changes in light as it reveals or obscures land or seascapes. Burggraf modulates colors, contrasts soft and sharp edges, and experiments with interlocking forms that bulge or recede. Each color construction is designed to evoke multiple times and places; Burggraf uses blocks of color to take viewers on a visual journey through conventional atmosphere, and then bring them to Earth with a horizontal line, or horizon line, that re-asserts the landscape.

One of the best examples of Burggraf's innovative technique may be The W, on display in 2008 at The Mary Brogan Museum of Art and Science as part of Smithsonian magazine's Museum Day presentation. While Burggraf's work is abstract, distinctive environmental themes are evident in his paintings and color constructions:

"My abstract paintings and color constructions highlight Earth's light and atmosphere. With glowing, jewel-like colors, smooth gradations emerge to evoke the grandeur of breathtaking vistas. Thoughts of oceans and the blazes of sunsets burst into creation from paintings on thin, sinuously-shaped panels of wood. They are a succession of linked landscape scenes remembered.''

Florida coastal environs and perhaps even beach-culture airbrush art are strongly reflected in my work. Precise color gradations are my signature; they are hand brushed rather than sprayed. Visual excitement flows like music and builds like progressive architectural morphology. Here, technique and theory work together to bring the language of modernist abstraction into the realm of contemporary landscape." (Ray Burggraf, 2010)

== Public collections ==
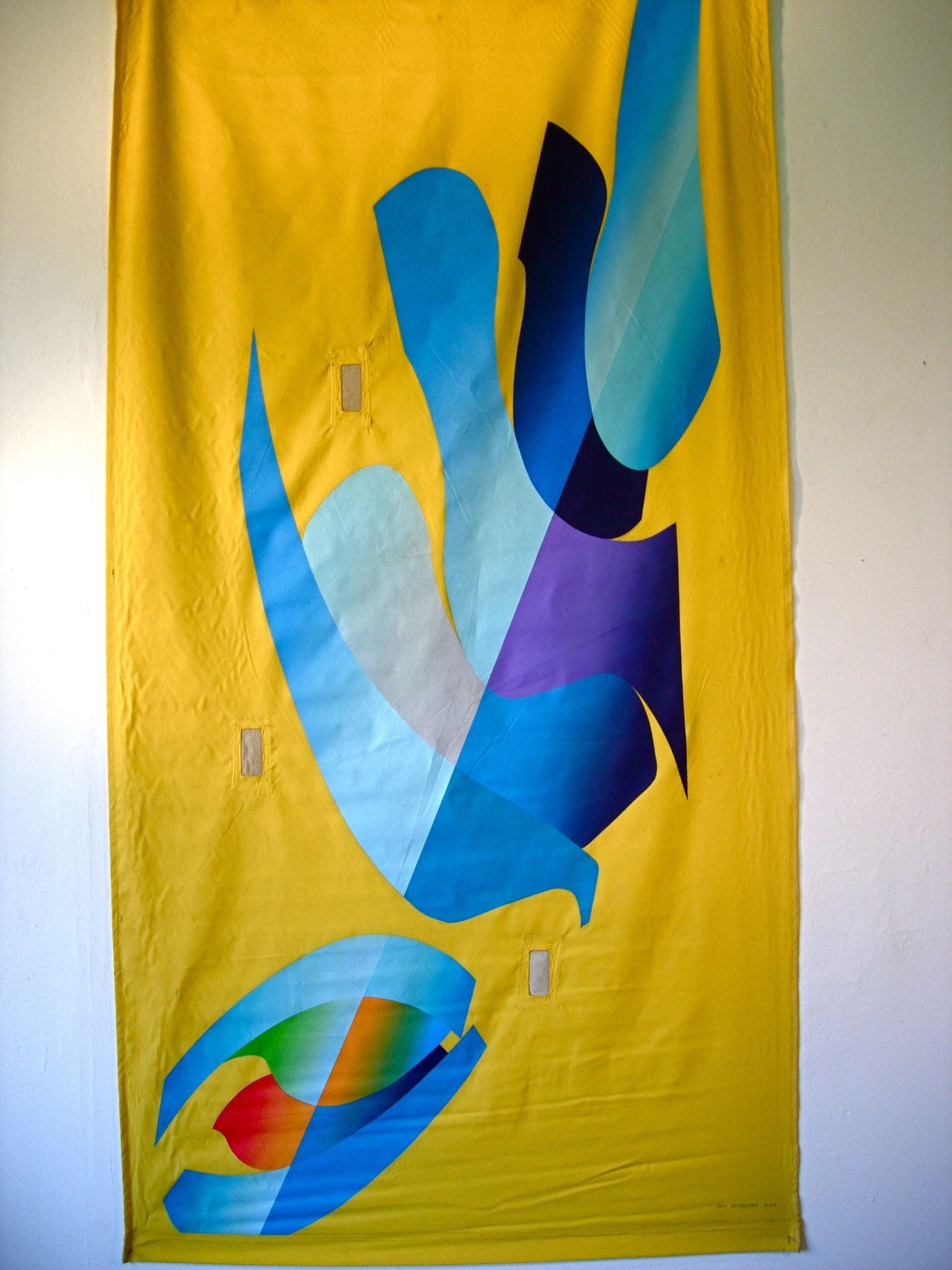
In Search of Fresh Air. Banner by Ray L. Burggraf. 4 x 8 feet. Flag Art Festival, "Poetry of the Winds". Location: 2002 FIFA World Cup, Seoul, Korea.

Ray L. Burggraf's paintings have been acquired by the following:

- Mint Museum of Art, Charlotte, NC
- Greenville County Museum of Art, Greenville, SC
- Montgomery Museum of Fine Arts, Montgomery, AL
- The University of Alabama Birmingham, Birmingham, AL
- Western Illinois University, Macomb, IL
- Vanderbilt University Theological Seminary, TN
- Dekalb College, Clarkston, GA
- Division of Cultural Affairs, Florida Department of State
- Florida State University, Psychology Department
- Florida State University, Devoe Center
- Broward Community College, South Campus, Three Locations
- Florida State University, Student Wellness Center, 2012
- National Public Art Project: Florida International University, Earnest R. Graham University Center, Three-Part Installation
- National Public Art Project: Florida State University, Student Life Center, One Painting, New Psychology Building, Two Locations
- National Public Art Project: Florida Department of Law Enforcement, Training Area, Tallahassee, Complex

== Corporate collections ==
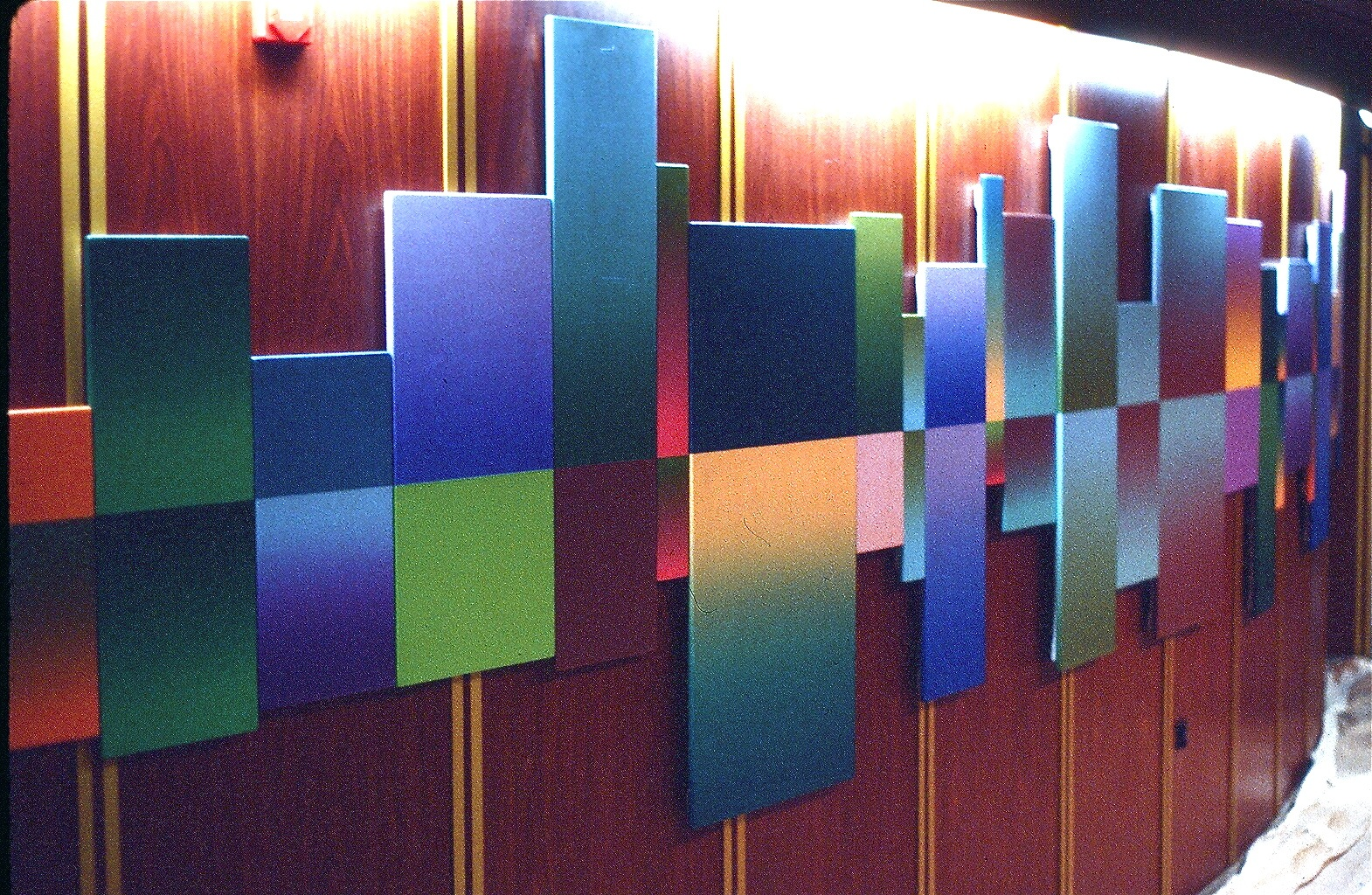
Curved Blues by Ray L. Burggraf. Acrylic paint on wood. Sun Viking, Royal Caribbean Cruise Lines, Inc. Port of Miami, FL. Installation: Barbara Gillman Fine Art, Miami Beach, FL.

Companies that have acquired works by Ray L. Burggraf:

- Alabama Power Company
- ATT Corporate Art Program, Piscataway, NJ
- Barnett Bank, Jacksonville, FL
- Continental Corporation, Miami, FL
- Eastman Pharmaceuticals, A Division of Eastman Kodak, Malvern, PA
- Royal Caribbean Cruise Lines, Inc., Sun Viking Cruise Ship, Port of Miami, FL
- The Southern Bell Tower Collection, Jacksonville, FL
- William R. Hough & Co., St. Petersburg, FL

== Solo exhibitions ==
- Ray Burggraf, Bob Rauschenberg Gallery, Edison State College, Fort Myers, FL, March 2011, University / regional show.
- Ray Burggraf Painting, Broward Community College, South Campus, Pembroke Pines, FL, November 2010, University / local show.
- Orbits and Horizons, Smithsonian Magazine Museum Day presentation, Mary Brogan Museum of Art and Science, Tallahassee, FL, September 2008, Museum / regional.
- A Florida Painter, Retrospective, Florida State University Museum of Fine Arts, Tallahassee, FL, February 2007, Museum / regional exhibition.
- Paintings from the Southeast, University of Texas at Brownsville & Texas Southernmost College, Brownsville, TX, 2002, University / National exhibit.
- Color Sensations: Painting Broward Community College, Pembroke Pines, FL, 2000, University / Regional exhibition.
- Spectrum Spaces, West Valley Art Museum, Phoenix, AZ, 1999, Museum / National exhibition.

== Selected US & international exhibitions ==
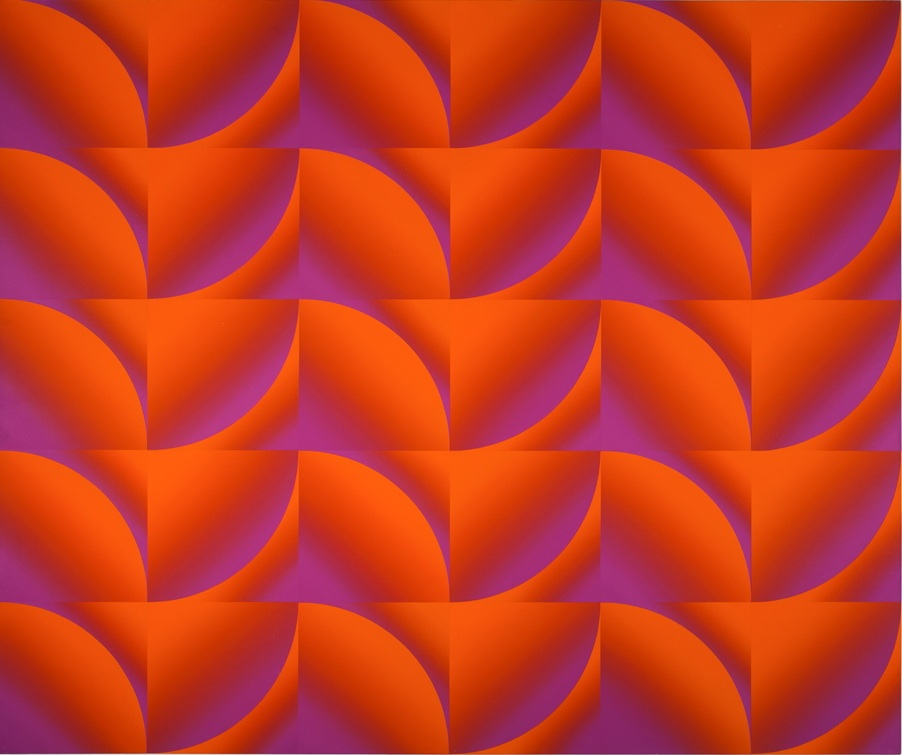
Inferno by Ray Burggraf. 1978. Acrylic on canvas. 65" x 78"

- Color it Color: Janice Hartwell, Ray Burggraf, Linda Van Beck; Le Moyne Center for the Visual Arts, Tallahassee, FL, January 2011, Non-profit exhibition space.
- 30th Anniversary Exhibition, 621 Gallery, May 2011, Tallahassee, FL. Non-profit space.
- FSU Permanent Collection, Group Show, Florida State University Museum of Fine Arts, Tallahassee, FL, June 2010, Museum exhibition.
- 2010/2011 Faculty Exhibition, Florida State University Art Department, Augustus B. Turnbull Conference Center, Florida State University; Tallahassee, FL, University exhibition.
- Love Your Mother: A pictorial discourse on the environment, LeMoyne Center for the Visual Arts, Tallahassee, FL, 42 Regional Artists, June 2007, Non-profit exhibition.
- Psychological Self Portrait, Invitational Group Show, Tallahassee City Hall, Tallahassee, FL, Non-profit exhibition.
- 31st Annual Juried Competition, Masur Museum of Art, Monroe, LA, 2004, Museum exhibition.
- VROOM, Art in Motion, Indiana University at Kokomo, Kokomo, IN, 2004, University exhibition.
- Color Explosion, The Kotinsky Gallery, Pompton Lakes, NJ, 2004, Gallery.
- 2004 Annual Florida Artists Exhibition, Art League of Bonita Springs, Bonita Springs, FL, 2004, Non-profit exhibition.
- Artescape, Naples, Gallery Victoria, Naples, FL, 2004, Gallery.
- Poetry of the Winds, 2002 Flag Art Festival, 2002 FIFA World Cup Korea / Japan, Nanjicheon Park, Seoul, Korea, Non-profit exhibition.
- Radiant Spaces, Gadsden Arts, Inc., Quincy, FL, Two-Person Show, Part of Seven Days of Opening Nights, 2001, Florida State University, Non-profit exhibition.
- Paintings: Ray Burggraf / Ron Trujilo, Lincoln Center, Fort Collins, CO, Two-Person Show, 2000, Non-profit exhibition.
- The Object as Art, Bender Fine Art, Atlanta, GA, Group Show, 2000, Gallery.
- Arthsma 2000, Arts Against Asthma, Lo-gallery, The Bronx, NY, Group Show, 2000, Gallery.
- Contemporary Exhibition, Leon Loard Gallery of Fine Arts, Montgomery and Birmingham, AL, Group Exhibition of Gallery Artists, Same Show - 1995, 1996, 1997, 1998, Gallery.
- Autumn Bacchanal, Tennessee Tech University, Cookeville, TN, Group Show, 1999, University / National exhibition.
- Celebrations, 1999, The Arts Center, St. Petersburg, FL, Group Show & Sale, Non-profit / Regional exhibition.
- World of Art, ART Addiction, Stockholm, Sweden, 1997, International Drawing Contest, Juried, Gallery / International exhibition.

== A Mysterious Clarity: Ray L. Burggraf, Mark Messersmith & Lillian Garcia-Roig (Collaboration) ==
- A Mysterious Clarity - 10th Anniversary, 621 Gallery, Tallahassee, FL, April 4–27, 2014.
- A Mysterious Clarity IX, Brevard Art Museum, Melbourne, FL, Nov. 2008 - Jan. 2009, Museum exhibition.
- A Mysterious Clarity VIII, Gulf Coast Museum of Art, Largo, FL, 2008, Museum exhibition.
- A Mysterious Clarity VII, Albany Museum of Art, Albany, GA, Slide Lecture, Albany State University, January 2007, Museum exhibition.
- A Mysterious Clarity VI, Art Basel, Miami, FL, (Wynwood Art District - FSU Grant Funded).
- A Mysterious Clarity V, Sam Houston State University, Huntsville, TX, Gallery Lecture-Burggraf, Feb., 2006, University exhibition.
- A Mysterious Clarity IV, Arts Center Galleries, Niceville, FL, October 2005, University exhibition.
- A Mysterious Clarity III, Jacksonville University, FL, Sept. 2005, University exhibition.
- A Mysterious Clarity II, Valdosta State University, Valdosta, GA, University exhibition.
- A Mysterious Clarity I, 621 Gallery, Tallahassee, FL, 2004, Non-profit exhibition.

== Papers and presentations ==
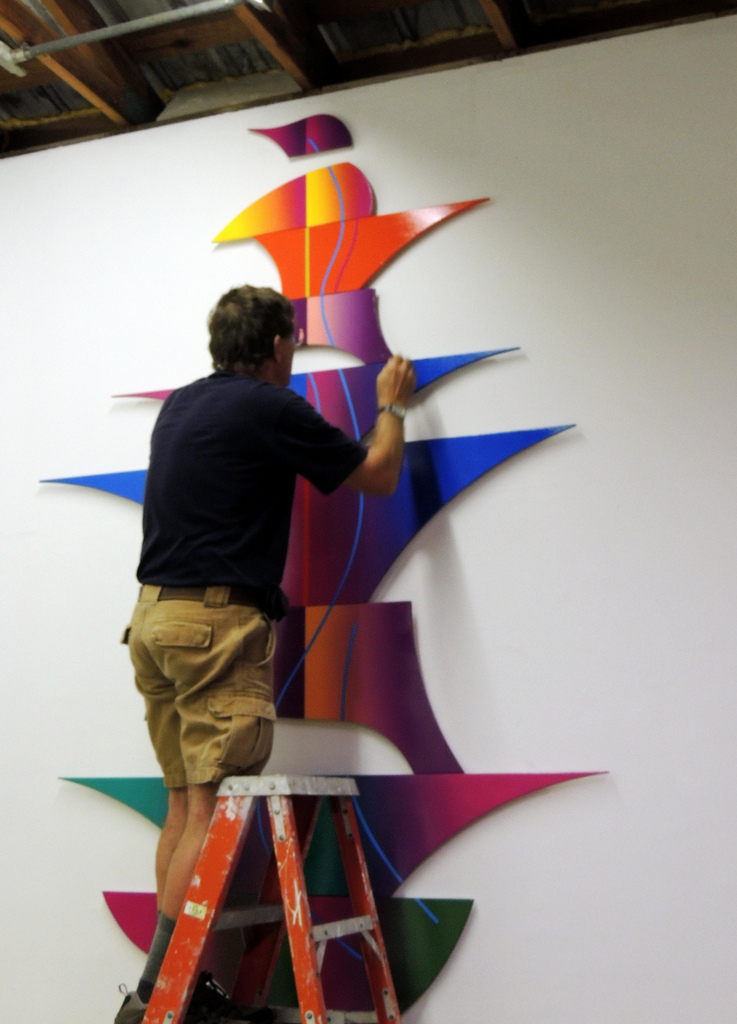
Ray L. Burggraf, assembling a recently completed color construction (2012). Photo courtesy of George Clark.

- Southeastern College Art Conference (SECAC/MCAA), A Painter's Thoughts of Contemporary Color Theory: The Useful, the Irrelevant and the Dangerous, Presented as a Panel Member, Session—Chromancing the Color Moshpit, Annual Meeting, Oct. 25-58, 2006, Nashville, TN
- Southeastern College Art Conference (SECAC), The Legacy of Bauhaus: A Selective Memory Helps, Presented as a Panel Member, Session--Bauhaus: An Idea or a History? Annual Meeting, Oct. 26-29, 2005, Little Rock, AR
- College Art Association (CAA), Bauhaus Color Theory in the Melting Pot, Panel Member, Session--Beyond Formalism: Teaching Color as Culture, 91st Annual Meeting, Feb. 19-22, 2003, New York, NY
- College Art Association (CAA), Painting the Compelling Force of Nature, Panel Member, Session--Visual Commentary on Culture and Nature, 84th Annual Meeting, Feb. 21-24, 1996, Boston, MA
- College Art Association (CAA), Regional Artistic Thought, Panel Member, Session--Aesthetics, Cultural Diversity, and Art Issues Outside New York, 83rd Annual Meeting, Jan. 25-28, 1995, San Antonio, TX
