= Samuel Bookatz =

American painter

- Samuel Bookatz at work, probably in 1942, painting murals for the U.S. Naval Hospital Corps School in Portsmouth, Virginia. This work was among fifteen Navy medical murals that Bookatz painted during World War II.
- Born: Samuel Bookatz; October 3, 1910; Philadelphia, Pennsylvania
- Died: November 16, 2009 (aged 99)
- Education: Cleveland School of Art, Boston School of Fine Arts, Harvard Medical School
- Movement: Realistic / Figurative Expressionist / Abstract Expressionist painter
- Awards: 1937 Prix de Rome 1940 Presidential Artist in Residence 1952 Corcoran 1st prize

Samuel Bookatz (October 3, 1910 – November 16, 2009) was a prolific painter who defied the demands of his blue collar, Orthodox Jewish upbringing to study art in the United States and Europe. Bookatz painted in a variety of styles: for commissions with presidential, military, political, and civic portraits; for religious and secular frescoes; and mostly for his own vision. In his private art, he developed from a realistic style to impressionist paintings, later to figurative expressionist and to increasingly abstract expressionist themes.

== Biography ==
Bookatz was the fourth of six children born in Philadelphia and soon moved to Cleveland with Russian immigrant parents who observed Orthodox Jewish practices. His father struggled to support the family as a carpenter. His mother refused to learn English after relocating from Lithuania to the U.S. His mother opposed Bookatz's early interest in art, preferring medical, law, or business training that would be more lucrative than the lower blue collar existence in which he was raised. He prevailed, defying his parents' wishes by working after high school graduation in a factory for three years while taking free art classes, finally saving enough to attend and graduate from the Cleveland School of Art. He won a Faculty prize that allowed him to study art at the Boston School of Fine Arts and anatomy at Harvard Medical School.

Bookatz produced early work strong enough that one submission won the 1937 Prix de Rome and allowed him to tour Europe studying art in London, Paris, and Rome for two years. That prize bestowed not only accolades for his work but a valuable free studio and complimentary access to all museums and educational facilities in Europe as a scholar. During that period, he exhibited at the American Academy of Rome, attended by King Victor Emmanuel. During his European tour he encountered problems with dictator-era authorities, was expelled from a train for assisting a Jewish child, and was arrested for failing to stand in his window alcove while sketching an orating Benito Mussolini. While in Europe he married Laurie Tridell of France after a whirlwind romance. She divorced him a year later when she was not permitted to accompany him in returning to the U.S.

Although his mother discarded his stored Cleveland artwork while he was overseas, Bookatz was able to mount a one-man show at the Cleveland Institute of Art in 1940 with the fruits of his European trip. Back in the U.S. he quickly developed a means for sustaining himself with art though portraits of prominent locals in 1940–41. One of these subjects, Cleveland Press science writer David Deitz, was on the National Reserve Council and was a consultant to the surgeon general. He inquired about Bookatz's lack of plans during a time of draft and war. Deitz made an introduction regarding a post President Roosevelt created "to commission an artist who would be attached to the National Medical Corps who would create murals depicting men in their line of duty."

Samuel Bookatz's Abstract Forest, c. 1950–69. Oil on board. Painting in private collection.

Samuel Bookatz's Fantasy, 1960. Mixed media. Painting in private collection.

Samuel Bookatz's Figures, 1960. Oil on canvas board. Painting in private collection.

Bookatz accepted the commission. His official enlistment was recalled by Jan Kenneth Herman, Navy Medical Department historian: "You're in the Navy. Report to the Navy Surgeon General in Washington. You're going to be an artist." He soon became FDR's personal painter and because of short supplies of office and studio space in wartime D.C., was ensconced in the White House in the Lincoln Bedroom for two years. He created official portraits of both Franklin and Eleanor Roosevelt during this time. He wrote, "The best light I had was sitting on the edge of Lincoln's bed and painting with my easel propped up in front of me." His portraits of five admirals hang at the National Naval Medical Center in Bethesda, Maryland. He painted Vice Adm. Ross T. McIntire (Navy Surgeon General and President Roosevelt's personal physician) and Pennsylvania governor David L. Lawrence as well.

In addition to increasingly impressionist still life and landscape paintings, and the realism of portraiture, Bookatz diversified his styles further: the murals were assignments as part of FDR's Federal Art Project of the Depression era "and I felt I had to conform to the social realism that was popular at the time." At the close of the war, his anatomical studies at Harvard allowed him to work for a year in Oakland, California, assisting surgeons with planning reconstructive facial surgery for injured military men.

Bookatz showed increasing interest in figurative expressionism in his personal artwork. From his non-commissioned paintings, he began submitting works to Washington's Corcoran Gallery biennial exhibitions in 1945—a practice he continued through 1961—developing a style whereby his "figure drawings are formed out of a complex amalgam of generalized abstraction and painstakingly detailed figuration." In 1948 he was given a one-person exhibition at the Corcoran. In 1950 he was given a one-person exhibition at the Smithsonian Institution.

In 1950, he met Joe Morgan, architect for the Marriott Corporation, based in Washington. The Marriott hotel chain was planning free-standing restaurants called the Hot Shoppes. Morgan commissioned Bookatz to create murals for all eight restaurants. The figurative expressionist scenes involved modern flower gardens with figures entwined. He also worked on increasingly abstract architectural details for temples, office buildings, and later frescoes for eight elder housing buildings by D.C. developer Joseph Della Ratta. In 1962 he developed, via a grant from the Ford Foundation, set designs for the D.C. Arena Stage. The increasingly abstract styles of painting can be seen in his works acquired by such friends as military man Jack Gross, whose art estate was bequeathed to the Harrisburg Art Association, and Pearl S. Buck.

Through these types of commissions, portraits, and architectural design, as well as occasional commercial endorsements such as a 1954 Crayola Crayon ad in American Artist, Bookatz was able to circumvent the rigors of gallery showings and income through sales in those venues. This allowed him to develop his personal art as he wished, absent of saleability considerations. He could instead submit works to museums and occasional pieces to the New York gallery Monede. In his pursuit of works that spoke to him, he co-founded the Washington Abstraction Group with Arshile Gorky.

In 1964, Bookatz married Helen Suzzann Meyer, and purchased a D.C. building to open a larger studio and the Bookatz Gallery. He later bought a different building in 1967 and again in 1973, always locating in D.C. Over the subsequent decades he worked in a style in which he moved from painting to painting in a single day, developing the canvasses over a period of time: "I can work on 12 canvasses in a one day ranging from realist to abstract." He showed less frequently in New York and other galleries, having his own display space in the building where his art studio was housed. He thereby amassed, over the decades, over 5,000 pieces. In 1999, he had a second one-person exhibition at the Corcoran.

After the turn of the 20th century, as he passed age 90, Bookatz conducted a search with the assistance of the Corcoran for a commercial gallery to handle sales of the paintings. In 2006, he selected a gallery in the Cleveland area, a nod to his childhood city. Since his death at age 99, the vast majority of his paintings, numbering in the thousands, are being overseen by the Bookatz Foundation. Samuel Bookatz was survived by his wife, Sue. He was buried in Arlington National Cemetery in January 2010.

== Reviews and commentary ==
"Samuel Bookatz has recently made a radical shift in his point of view toward painting... and has entered a period of experimentation, intensifying his color and breaking up his line. In a sense, he has made his painting more impersonal, the better to express his emotional response to what he sees."

The portraits "adhere to the academic tradition—warm flesh tones and meticulous brush technique in accord with formal practice," while the non-portraits show a style of painting in "a broad sweeping fashion with spatula or palette knife," his pieces "combined wash and impastos or ink and pastel with emulsion seeking a luminous gem-like quality."

A review of a 1961 show at Monede Gallery, New York: "His mastery of drawing is apparent," Bookatz may have been a "newcomer to NY though by no means a beginner," "his paintings constitute a genuinely personal world and have modesty of conception and attitude." "Particular to Bookatz is the frequent graceful rhythm which runs through the figures and, more basically, through one painting, since several heads are merely ovals which are repeated below to suggest spirals. The color is never diverse and often green, gray, or blue."

Bookatz's "canvasses are filled with improvisational visual exchanges that are deeply reflective of the lessons of pre- and post-war abstraction." "Working simultaneously on nearly a dozen different paintings at a time, he moves back and forth between different styles, media, and subjects as if they were all pieces of the same complicated puzzle."

== Exhibitions and awards ==
=== Selected solo exhibitions ===
- 1938 American Academy in Rome
- 1939 Academia Colarossi Gallery, Paris
- 1940 Cleveland Institute of Art
- 1948 Corcoran Gallery, D.C.
- 1950 Smithsonian Institution
- 1998 Cleveland Institute of Art
- 1999 Corcoran Gallery

=== Selected prizes, awards, and commissions ===
- 1937 Prix de Rome
- 1940 Presidential Artist in Residence
- 1952 Corcoran 1st prize

=== In permanent collections ===
- Smithsonian Institution
- Library of Congress
- Corcoran Gallery, D.C.
- The Phillips Collection, D.C.
- Hirshhorn Museum, D.C.
- Cleveland Museum of Art
- Butler Institute of American Art, Youngstown OH
- Pennsylvania Academy of Fine Arts, Philadelphia
- Pennsylvania State Capitol
- Navy Medical Museum, murals and portraits
