= Montgomery Museum of Fine Arts =

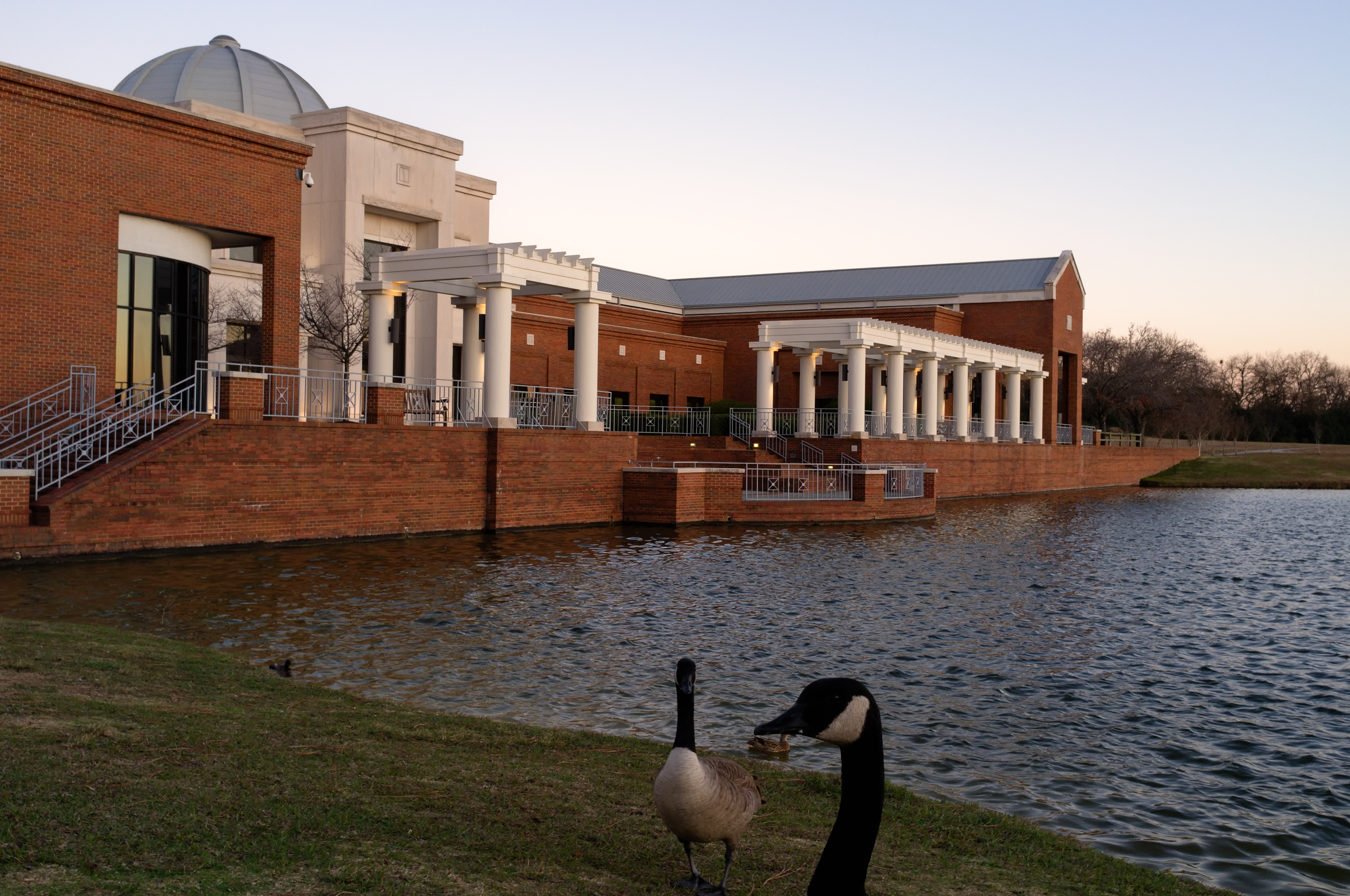
- Established: 1930
- Location: Montgomery, Alabama, USA
- Coordinates: 32.35102°N 86.20650°W
- Type: Art Museum
- Website: www.mmfa.org

The Montgomery Museum of Fine Arts is a museum located in Montgomery, Alabama, USA, featuring several art collections. The permanent collection includes examples of 19th- and 20th-century American paintings and sculpture, Southern regional art, Old Master prints and decorative arts. It is also home to Artworks, a participatory art gallery and studio for children.

The current building was designed by the Montgomery architectural firm of Barganier, Davis, and Sims and opened in 1988. An addition was completed in 1993.

== History ==
The Montgomery Museum of Fine Arts was founded in 1930 with the mission "to collect, preserve, exhibit, and interpret art of the highest quality for the enrichment, enlightenment, and enjoyment of its public." The museum is the oldest fine arts museum in Alabama and was the first museum in Alabama to be accredited by the American Alliance of Museums in June 1978. The museum moved to its current home in the Blount Cultural Park, in 1988.

The museum's permanent collection consists of paintings, sculpture, and works on paper that represent the work of artists of national as well as regional reputation. The core of the American collection is the Blount Collection of American Art, a group of forty-one paintings that includes works by John Singer Sargent, Edward Hopper, and Winslow Homer. The MMFA has a collection of Old Master prints, including works by Rembrandt, Dürer, and Whistler. The museum hosts a broad range of temporary exhibitions with art from international and American collections as well as works by contemporary artists.

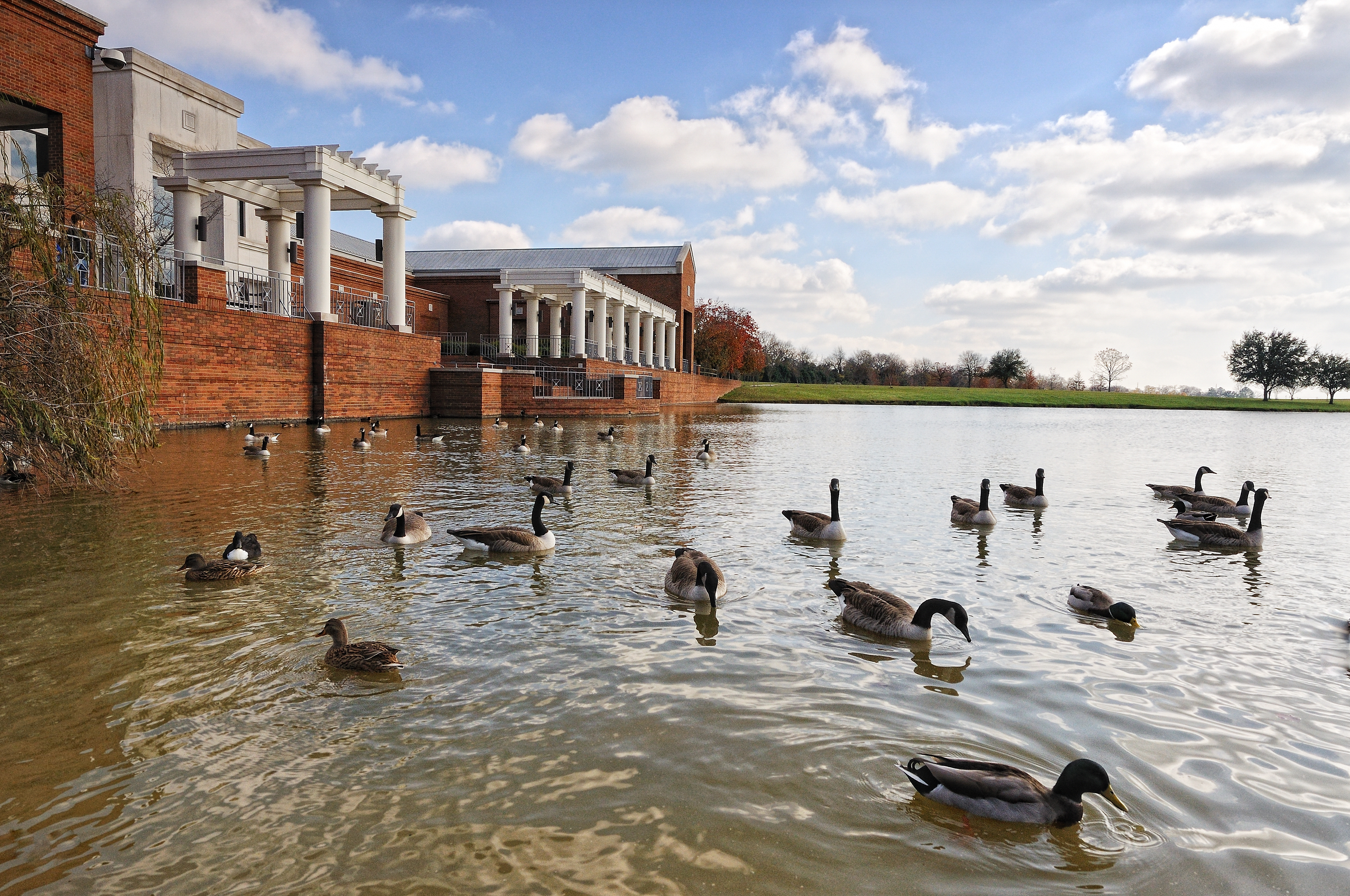
Another lakeside view of the museum.

The MMFA receives approximately two-thirds of its annual budget from the city and county of Montgomery, with the remainder provided through the MMFA Association, a private support group. Corporate and individual memberships comprise the largest source of MMFA Association revenue. Additional income is generated through the Museum Shop, special events, catalog sales and program fees. In March 2007, a new Education Wing was added, doubling the size of the ARTWORKS interactive gallery and studio space. This expansion allowed the museum to more fully accommodate the demands of growing public interest. The museum is a member of the North American Reciprocal Museums program.

The museum opened the John and Joyce Caddell Sculpture garden in 2018, on three acres as part of the adjoining park. The garden features traveling exhibits from throughout the world.

== Galleries and collections ==
=== Hudson and Krenshaw Galleries ===
- Jacques Amans, Portrait of J.A. Rozier
- Adolph Weinman, Rising Day
- Adolph Weinman, Descending Night

=== Blount Collection ===
- John Singer Sargent, Mrs. Louis E. Raphael (Henriette Goldschmidt) (ca. 1906)
- John Singleton Copley, Joseph Henshaw (ca. 1770–1774)
- John Sloan, Grand Central Station (1924)

=== Decorative Arts ===
- Worcester Porcelain Factory, Tankard (1754–1755
- Worcester Porcelain Factory, Teapot and Cover (ca. 1758–1760)

=== Young Gallery ===
- Dale Kennington, Long Day, Late Night (2002–2004)

=== Studio Glass (Weil Atrium) ===
- Robin Grebe, Sybil (2006)
- William Morris, Reliquary Vessel (1998)

=== John and Joyce Caddell Sculpture Garden ===
- Adam Bodine, What You Say (2012)
- Craigger Browne and Marcello Giorgi, Nostra Luna (2019)
- Deborah Butterfield, Isbelle (2001)
- Patrick Dougherty, Rough and Tumble (2020)
- Casey Downing, Jr., Circular (2018)
- Christopher Fennell, Skate Leaves, (2018)
- Randy Gachet, Hollow Sphere Theory (2018)
- Jamey Grimes, Teraxacum (2019)
- Joe Minter, The Sweat of the Mule and the Sharecropper (s.d.)
- Joe Minter, Tools of the Sharecropper (s.d.)
- Joe Minter, The Next Generation of Sharecroppers (s.d.)
- Joe Minter, The Zulu Chief Surrounded by Four Warriors (s.d.)
- Chris Boyd Taylor, Stadium Sphere no. 1 (2018)
- Craig Wedderspoon, Oval (2018)
- Jessie Duncan Wiggin, Untitled (Nymph) (1933)

== See also ==
- Alabama Shakespeare Festival, also in Montgomery's Blount Cultural Park
- Ray Burggraf
