= Jurgen Faust =

Jurgen Faust (born 1955 in Germany) is a design professor who has worked in four different countries as a Professor for Design, Theory and Media as well as an administrative Dean. He is a co-founder of a private university in Germany, as well as a developer of many undergraduate and graduate programs in a variety of fields.

Over the past years he has specialized in managing through designing and published about the idea transferring design methods and processes into the Management field, based on his work about a comprehensive theory to describe design processes. He also taught design and design theory. He contributed to a variety of books and publications. In addition he is a practicing researcher, designer, and artist, who showed in many places, including museums and galleries in Europe, Germany, France, England, Italy, Poland and Slovakia as well as the United States.

Faust is currently the President Macromedia University of Applied Sciences in Munich where he teaches Design and Design Theory.

== Education ==
Faust graduated in 1997 from Reutlingen University in Chemistry. At the Free Academy in Nuertingen he studied and graduated in Fine Arts 1982. In 2014 he finished his PhD at the Planetary Collegium, University of Plymouth, UK on the topic of "Discursive Designing Design, Towards a comprehensive Design Theory".

== Work ==
He started his professional career 1986-1999 as the co-founder, co-director and faculty of the Kunstseminar Metzingen (now University of Applied Sciences Schwaebisch Hall).

In 1997 he became Dean at the Department of arts and Media at the University of Applied Sciences Metzingen. In 1998 he worked as a visiting professor at the CSU, Cleveland State University. At the Cleveland Institute of Art, Design and Media Design he worked as a Professor from 1999 until 2006. Meanwhile, he got appointed as Dean of Integrated Media Environment and was responsible for T.I.M.E (Technology and Integrated Media–where he was also the chair from 2000 to 2006), and for the redesign of curricula in Print Media, Drawing, Illustration, Communication Design as well as Biomedical Communication.

In spring 2005 he was also responsible for Visual Communication, Medical and Scientific Illustration. As Dean of Academic Affairs and Chief Academic Officer he worked from January until December 2006 at the CEDIM in Monterrey, Mexico, and from January until June 2007 he worked as the Professor of Design and Design Theory at the Monterrey Tecnologico. Since May 2007 he is the Chief Academic Officer at the Istituto Europeo di Design (IED), Group, Milan (Italy) and works as Professor for Media Design at the University of Applied Sciences Munich, MF Munich.

Since August 2006 he has been Professor for Digital Media and since October 2008 Dean at the Macromedia University of Applied Sciences for media and communication. From 2008 - 2013 he was the Dean at MHMK, Munich, Germany. Between 2010 - 2013 as well the Vice President for Academic Affairs and Research, MHMK Munich, Germany Since 2013 he is the acting President Macromedia University Munich, Germany

== Focus ==
For 20 years he has taught and built up graduate and undergraduate programs in design schools. For more than 10 years he has headed digital arts programs, initiated curriculum design and lead the process of development and implementation. He works closely with industry exposing students to real world problems and possible solutions.
