= Martha Elizabeth Burchfield Richter =

American watercolorist (1924–1977)

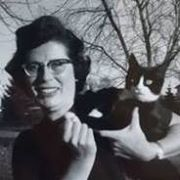
- Burchfield Richter in 1958
- Born: Martha Elizabeth Burchfield; June 28, 1924; Buffalo, New York, U.S.
- Died: April 10, 1977 (aged 52)
- Education: Cleveland Institute of Art
- Known for: Watercolor, painting, drawing
- Spouse: Henry Richter
- Relatives: Charles E. Burchfield

Martha Elizabeth Burchfield Richter (June 28, 1924 – April 10, 1977) was an American watercolorist, the daughter of artist Charles Ephraim Burchfield (1893–1967). Similarly to her father, Burchfield had an affinity for flowering plants, trees, and landscapes. She painted almost exclusively with watercolors and is known for her depictions of nature throughout the seasons, and landscapes of rural America. She is known by the customary signature "M. Burchfield" on all her paintings. Including those painted after the change of her surname following her marriage in 1946 to Henry Richter.

Her paintings and drawings can be found in the Smithsonian, Ford Motor Company, SUNY Buffalo State, and the Burchfield-Penney Art Center. She has been the subject of exhibitions at the Butler Institute of American Art, the Sisti Gallery in Buffalo, Central Park Gallery in Buffalo and the Buffalo Garret Club. She has also had solo exhibits in cities around American including Detroit, Salem and Youngstown.

The largest collection of Burchfield's paintings and studies are in the personal collection of Louise Simon Schoene of West Seneca, New York. Schoene owns the copyright to all of Richter's works and is organizing an exhibit of Burchfield's paintings as part of a three-generational Burchfield exhibition scheduled for April 2017 at the Kenan Center in Lockport, New York.

Additionally, Schoene loaned seven of Burchfield's paintings to the producers of the feature-length movie Marshall, a biography of Thurgood Marshall, the first African-American Supreme Court justice, which was filmed in Buffalo in summer 2016.

== Life ==
=== Early years ===
Born in Buffalo, New York, on June 28, 1924, Burchfield was raised by her parents, Charles, a painter who also worked for a time as a designer at the H.M. Birge wallpaper company, and Bertha (née Kenreich) Burchfield, a homemaker. At 2 years of age, Burchfield with her family moved to the Gardenville area of West Seneca, New York, where she remained for the rest of her life.

Burchfield was the second oldest of five children. She and her siblings, Mary Alice, Sarah Ruth (Sally), Catherine and Arthur grew up across the street from the 29-acre Island Park, which in 1999 became the Charles E. Burchfield Nature & Art Center (BNAC) in honor of her father. It is composed of wild and cultivated gardens, a large playground, nature trails, and an outdoor amphitheater alongside the banks of the Buffalo Creek.

In 1928, Charles approached artist-gallerist Frank Rehn to see whether he could afford to paint full-time by selling through the Rehn gallery in New York City. Though the decision to leave Birge wallpaper company preceded the Great Depression, Charles's works continued to sell. From thereon, he was able to support the family through his artwork.

From early childhood, Burchfield loved to draw and paint. She was encouraged by her father and her talent was evident. At age 12, she won a drawing contest earning her $1 and a story in the paper.

=== Education ===
==== Childhood and adolescent education ====
Burchfield attended Gardenville High School, which was named for its location in the Gardenville section of West Seneca. The school system promoted Richter one grade and she ended up in the same class as her sister Mary Alice who was a year older. On her 17th birthday in 1941, Burchfield became the salutatorian of her graduating class while Mary Alice was named valedictorian.

==== Further education ====
After graduation, Burchfield attended Albright Art School in Buffalo for one year studying with artists Philip C. Elliott and Florence Julia Bach. With the help of scholarships, she followed in her father's footsteps and studied at the Cleveland Institute of Art. Her mentors at the institute included such artists as William Joseph Eastman, Carl Frederick Gaertner, and Paul Travis. Her aunt, Louise Burchfield, served as the institute's assistant curator of painting at the institute.

=== Family and personal life ===
==== Family of artists ====
Along with Richter, her sister Catherine Burchfield Parker (1926–2012) and daughter, Peggy Richter Haug (Born May 11, 1948), also became painters. Parker painted more abstracts, but Peggy also liked to paint landscapes and said she loved the Western New York countryside. When Haug was a teenager and young adult, she participated in three-generational exhibits alongside her mother and grandfather.

==== Marriage ====
On August 3, 1946, Burchfield married Henry (Hank) Richter, a local boy who served for three and a half years in the Army Air Force in the European Theater. The couple was married in her parents' home, with siblings Catherine and Arthur Burchfield serving as maid of honor and best man respectively.

The couple lived on Cloverside Drive in West Seneca, just a little more than a mile from her parents' home. She was the only one of the five children to remain in West Seneca through adulthood.

Martha and Henry raised three children. Along with daughter Peggy, she had two sons: Tom (born Sept. 20, 1949) and David (born June 9, 1953). She stayed home with the children while he served as the assistant to the highway superintendent for the Town of West Seneca. He also worked as a flight instructor and FAA examiner.

In news interviews, Richter talked about her love of cooking, sewing, and raising children, but she also spoke to her yearning to create art. In an April 1960 interview with Jean Reeves in the Buffalo Evening News titled "Amid Houseful of Distractions, Woman Artist Paints on," Richter said, "All my life I wanted to be an artist. But I fought against it. I'd stand in front of Dad's paintings and I'd think Why try? But they inspired me, too. But it was a lost cause, and I decided that all I really wanted to do was paint, so why fight it? Painting isn't something I took up as a means of escape from dishes and diapers. The urge to paint was there before any frustration with housework. A serious artist paints because he has to; it's an inborn drive."

An article in The Buffalo Evening News (November 30, 1946) reported that when she got married four months previously she had planned to give up painting if it interfered with her housework. "She is, however, pleased to discover that she can manage both and in addition to having dinner ready when her husband returns from work she frequently greets him with a new watercolor."

Peggy Richter Haug described her childhood like this, "We grew up going out to the countryside often. My mom would pile us kids in the car and she would then search for an old or deserted house or barn. We would climb all over and explore while she would paint." She also described her mother as devoted to home and children; she remembers her mother making dinner for the family every evening.

==== Her studio ====
Although Burchfield favored en plein air painting, she also had a studio for convenience and unfavorable weather. For many years during her marriage, Richter painted in her bedroom. Eventually, her husband contracted to have an artist studio built for Richter above the garage.

=== Death ===
Much of her last few years are known through an interview with Peggy Haug, Burchfield Richter's daughter, taken on July 15, 2016, by Laurie Kaiser a writer from Buffalo.

Burchfield was very close to her father and following her father's death in 1967 suffered greatly. "she was very emotionally attached to her father... it was difficult for her when he died."

Throughout most of her lifetime Richter suffered from depression. She saw psychiatrists for her depression and they prescribed tranquilizers and sleeping pills, which often left her in a fog instead of feeling better. While her depression was very difficult for her and her family, Haug describes her as someone who embraced the good and the bad. "From her, we got the ability to live fully, she grabbed hold of life and was fun-loving. Women in those days didn't have the means to express themselves. They didn't know how. But she did."

Burchfield's mental state deteriorated in the mid-1970s after her children had left home. On April 10, 1977, aged 52, she died by suicide.

== Artist style and influences ==
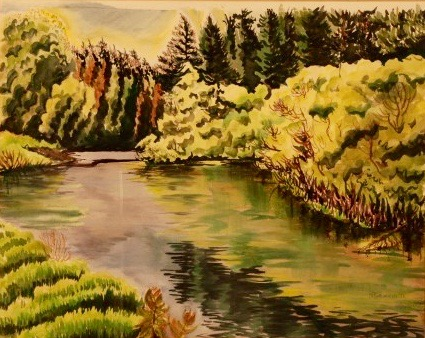
July Reflections, 1972. Burchfield Penney Art Center, Buffalo.

Burchfield painted almost exclusively with watercolors, often employing a dry technique (using little water) over a pencil sketch, much as her father did.

She was known for painting en plein air — on the scene and in the open. Burchfield loved summer and relished painting summer scenes, saying that is "when I feel most alive." She was known for driving around until she found a painting location that appealed to her.

In the opening notes to the program for her solo exhibition at the Butler Institute of American Art in October 1966, Charles Burchfield described Burchfield's watercolors as having "an unspoiled, innocent freshness about them; lyrical in character, with also a tinge of primitiveness. With experience and increasing knowledge, the primitive note has vanished, but the lyrical quality has remained and grown steadily, to which has been added the drama of light and an awareness of the more sophisticated problems of landscape painting. She has an inborn sense of pattern and composition, strikingly evident in her childhood attempts, which has carried through into her mature work."

In November 1960 the editors of Ford Magazine used eight of Burchfield's paintings to illustrate a four-page story about Gardenville, New York.

All of Burchfield's instructors insisted that she not be influenced by her father and told her to develop her own style to which she replied, "Every young artist is influenced by someone, even my father."

Charles taught her "to see" nature on trips across the countryside to paint with him and taught her some of his techniques. Consequently, there was a continual comparison between her work and that of her famous father that she could not escape.

Art critic and abstract artist Trevor Thomas wrote that Richter "commands an almost impeccable cleanliness of rendering and handles the accepted hieroglyphics for trees, leaves, grass, flowers, and old houses with accustomed assurance."

He also compared her style to her father's, saying that while Charles had the intuitive ability to evoke a sense of mystery and wonder behind the appearances of ordinary scenes, Burchfield "is content to look at what she views and to delineate it with a given vocabulary of colors and an accepted grammar of strokes. She does not probe beneath the surface for the inherent magic or mystery. She can set the scene well but the drama remains offstage."

She won awards for her work, including first prize from that Buffalo Society of Artists "Statler Show" in Buffalo on May 4, 1950, along with many other first prizes and honorable mentions at various local exhibitions. She also taught painting in adult education courses held in West Seneca.

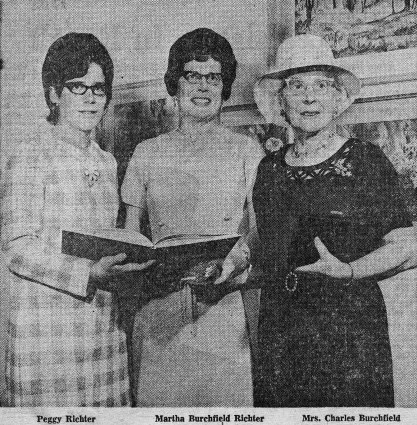
Buffalo Courier-Express, "Photograph of Peggy Richter, Martha Burchfield Richter, and Mrs. Charles Burchfield", c.1968; newsprint.

== Exhibits ==
At age 21, Burchfield had her first one-person show at the Art Institute of Buffalo. An article about the show in the November 30, 1945 Buffalo Evening News compared her to her father as a "regionalist." "Western New York's meadows, creeks, roads, and small towns are sensitively recorded by her brushes….If there is a quality, rather than a technique, which she shares with her famous father, it is the spirit of fantasy that animates her skies, mottling the horizons with clouds that seem under pressures of wind to achieve a full, rolling boil."

The next year she participated in a group exhibition, "Advent of Spring," with the Buffalo Society of Artists, repeating an exhibition with that group in 1948 at the Albright Art Gallery. In 1960, she exhibited in a solo show at the Junior League of Buffalo's clubroom, and in 1961, she had another solo exhibition of 24 watercolors at the Sisti Gallery in Buffalo.

Also, in 1961, she had 25 of her works exhibited at the Canisius College Library. She had a solo exhibition of 38 paintings and a few drawings at Central Park Gallery in Buffalo, New York, from 1968 to 1969. In 1967, another solo show at the Sisti Gallery resulted in a near sell-out of her paintings, two of which were purchased by newspaper art critics. In spring 1968, the Lakeview Gallery of Art in Hamburg, New York, hosted a three-generational exhibit featuring the work of Charles Burchfield, Martha Burchfield, and Peggy Richter, a 19-year-old volunteer working with Trinity Lutheran Church on the Lower East Side to help poor black and Puerto Rican families.

D.K. Winebrenner, a writer with the Buffalo Courier-Express (February 3, 1968) described Burchfield's work as "well-composed, structurally sound and painted with great sympathy for the subject."

In 1973, Burchfield again exhibited with her father and her daughter at the Raydon Gallery in New York City in the show "Three Generations of Burchfields," which included 68 combined watercolors.
