= Max Kalish =

American sculptor from Belarus

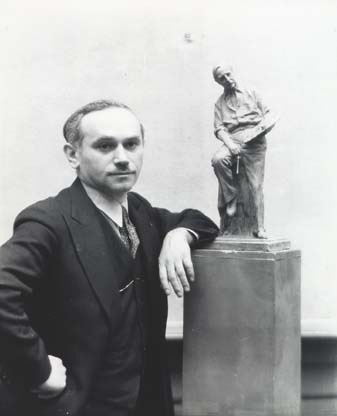
- Born: Max Kalashick; March 1, 1891; Valozhyn, Russian Empire
- Died: March 18, 1945 (aged 54); Manhattan, New York
- Occupation: sculptor
- Notable work: statue of Abraham Lincoln in Cleveland, Ohio

Max Kalish (born Kalashick; March 1, 1891 – March 18, 1945) was a Belarusian-American sculptor in Cleveland, Ohio, best known for his sculptures of laborers.

== Early life ==
Kalish was born in Wolozyn, Russian Empire (now Valozhyn, Belarus), to Yoel Kalashick (also spelt Kolasik or Kalatzik) and Anna Levinson.

His Orthodox Jewish family emigrated from the Russian Empire to Cleveland in 1898, when he was 7 years old. His father worked as a cigar maker. He had three brothers, Abram, Arthur, and Jacob (Jack). He began to show artistic talent as a boy and won a scholarship to the Cleveland School of Art.

== Career ==
Kalish studied with Herman Matzen at the Cleveland School of Art; in New York City with Herbert Adams at the National Academy of Design, and in the studios of Alexander Stirling Calder and Isidore Konti; and in Paris with Paul Wayland Bartlett at the Académie Colorossi, and Jean Antoine Injalbert at the École des Beaux-Arts.

He enlisted in the Army in 1917 after the U.S. joined the war. He was stationed at the medical hospital at Camp Cape May, New Jersey, where his artistic ability and knowledge of anatomy proved useful for the developing field of plastic surgery for wounded soldiers.

A travelling exhibition of his work, titled "Glorification of the U.S. Workingman", stopped in Detroit in January 1927.

Washington, D.C. publisher Willard M. Kiplinger commissioned Kalish to create fifty portrait statuettes of prominent figures in World War II era politics, arts and sciences. Kiplinger donated the statuettes to the Smithsonian Institution in 1944.

Kalish was the author of Labor Sculpture, largely a collection of photographs of these statues of workers. Most of those statutes were in a Social realism style. Critic Emily Genauer wrote in 1938, "It is the workmen who dominate the American scene, and who have become as surely symbolic of their time as the pioneers in covered wagons, and the robber barons and the great merchant princes were in their respective eras." This was what Kalish portrayed in his art.

== Personal life ==
Kalish married Alice Neuman in 1927. They had two sons, Richard and James. They lived in Paris until World War II.

He died in 1945 at Mount Sinai Hospital in Manhattan.

== Works ==
Examples of Kalish's work can be found in:

- Baby’s Head, Canajoharie Library and Art Gallery, Canajoharie, New York
- Old Man Resting, Massillon Museum, Massillon, Ohio
- Portrait of a Boy, North Carolina Museum of Art, Raleigh, North Carolina
- Gold Prospector, Canton Museum of Art, Canton, Ohio
- Head of Louis Kronberg, Museum of Fine Arts, Boston, Massachusetts
- Torso, Washington County Museum of Fine Arts, Hagerstown, Maryland
- Laborer at Rest, Newark Museum, Newark, New Jersey
- Torso (1925), Cleveland Museum of Art, Cleveland, Ohio
- Woodcutter (c1926)
- The Steelworker (c1926)
- The Discard (c1926)
- Spirit of American Labor (c1927)
- New Power
- The End of Day (1930), Smithsonian American Art Museum, Washington, D.C.
- Abraham Lincoln (1927–32), Board of Education, Cleveland, Ohio
- Man of Steel (before 1933), Smithsonian American Art Museum, Washington, D.C.
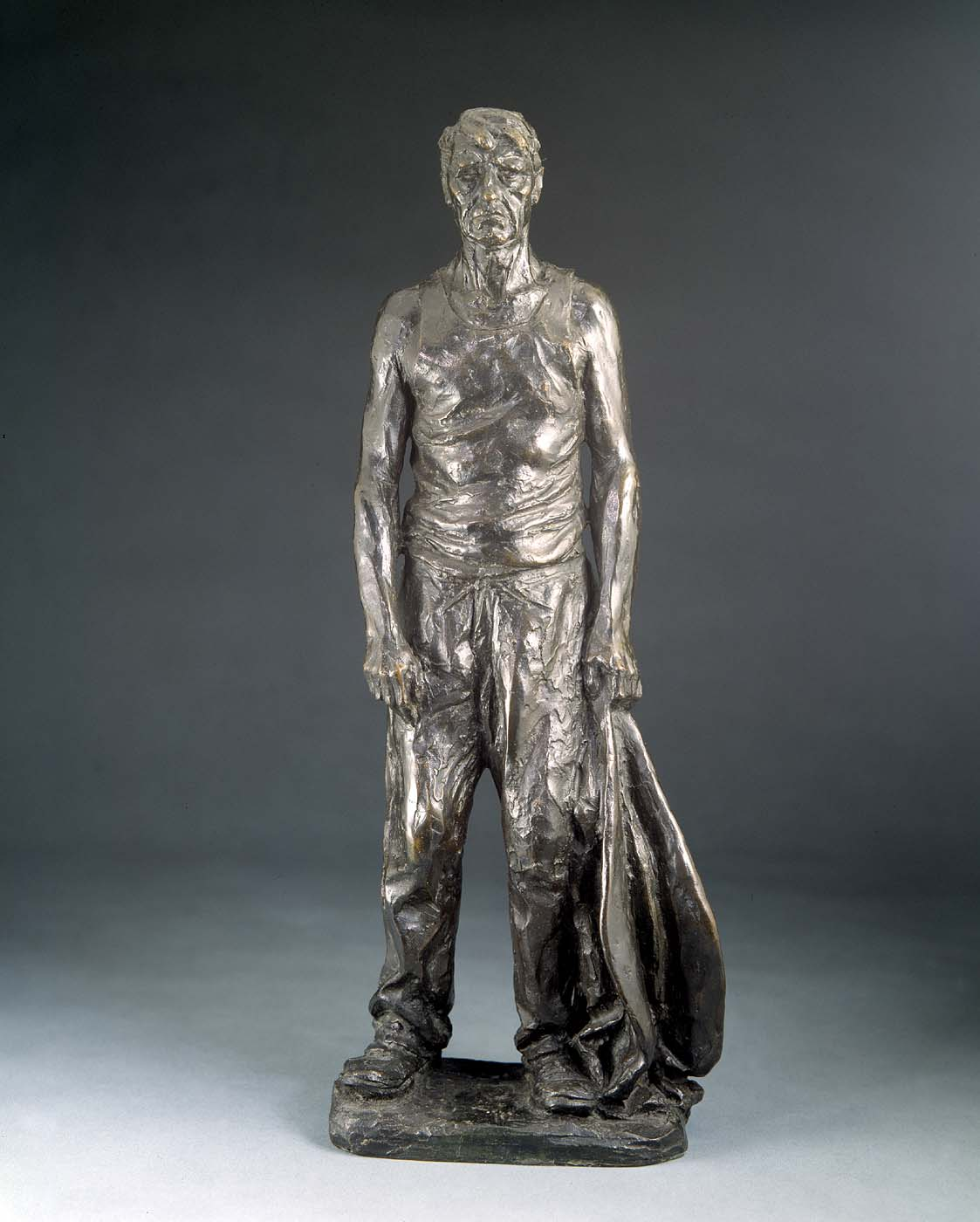
The End of Day (1930), Smithsonian American Art Museum.

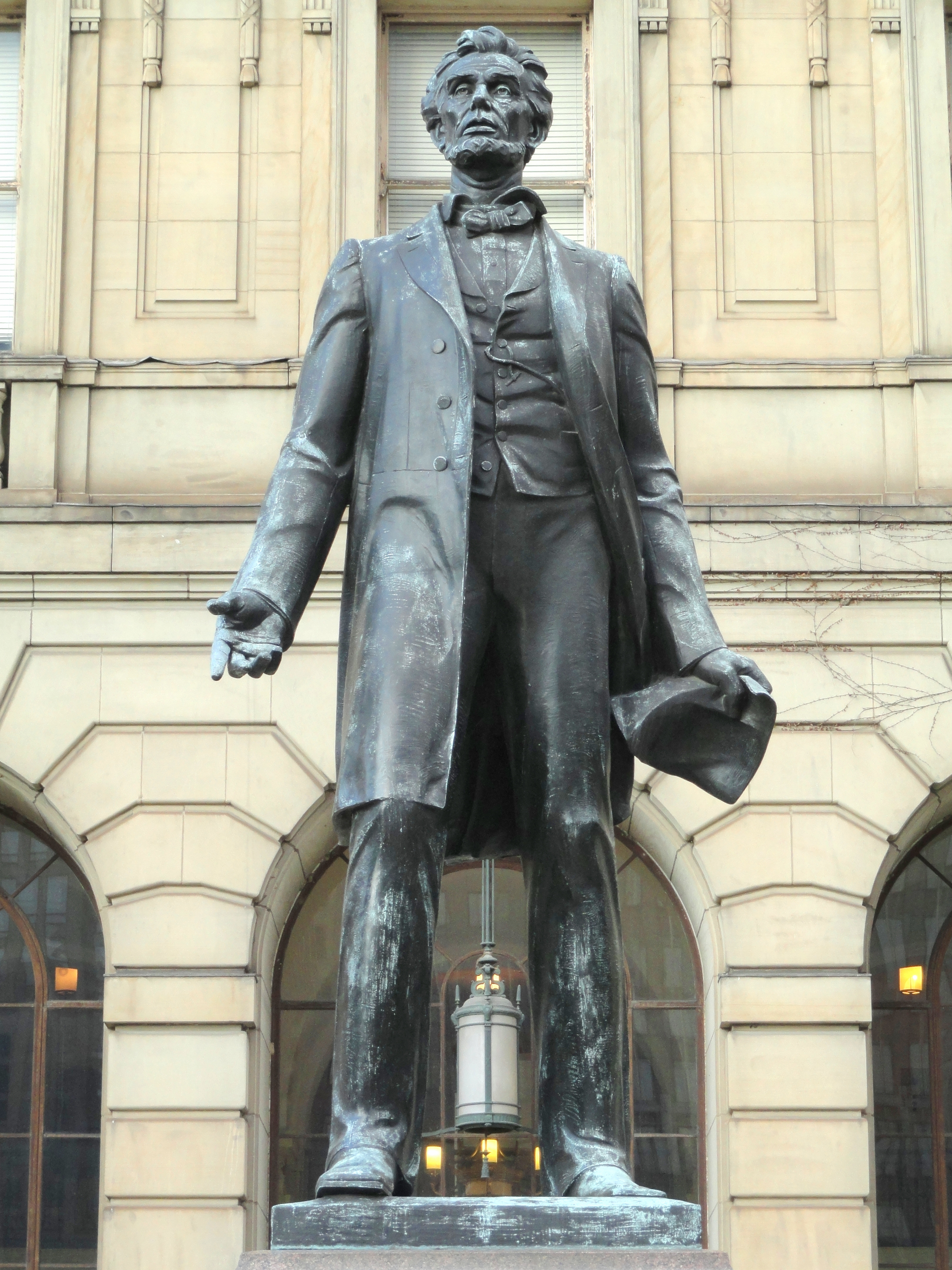
Abraham Lincoln (1927–32), Cleveland Municipal School District Headquarters.

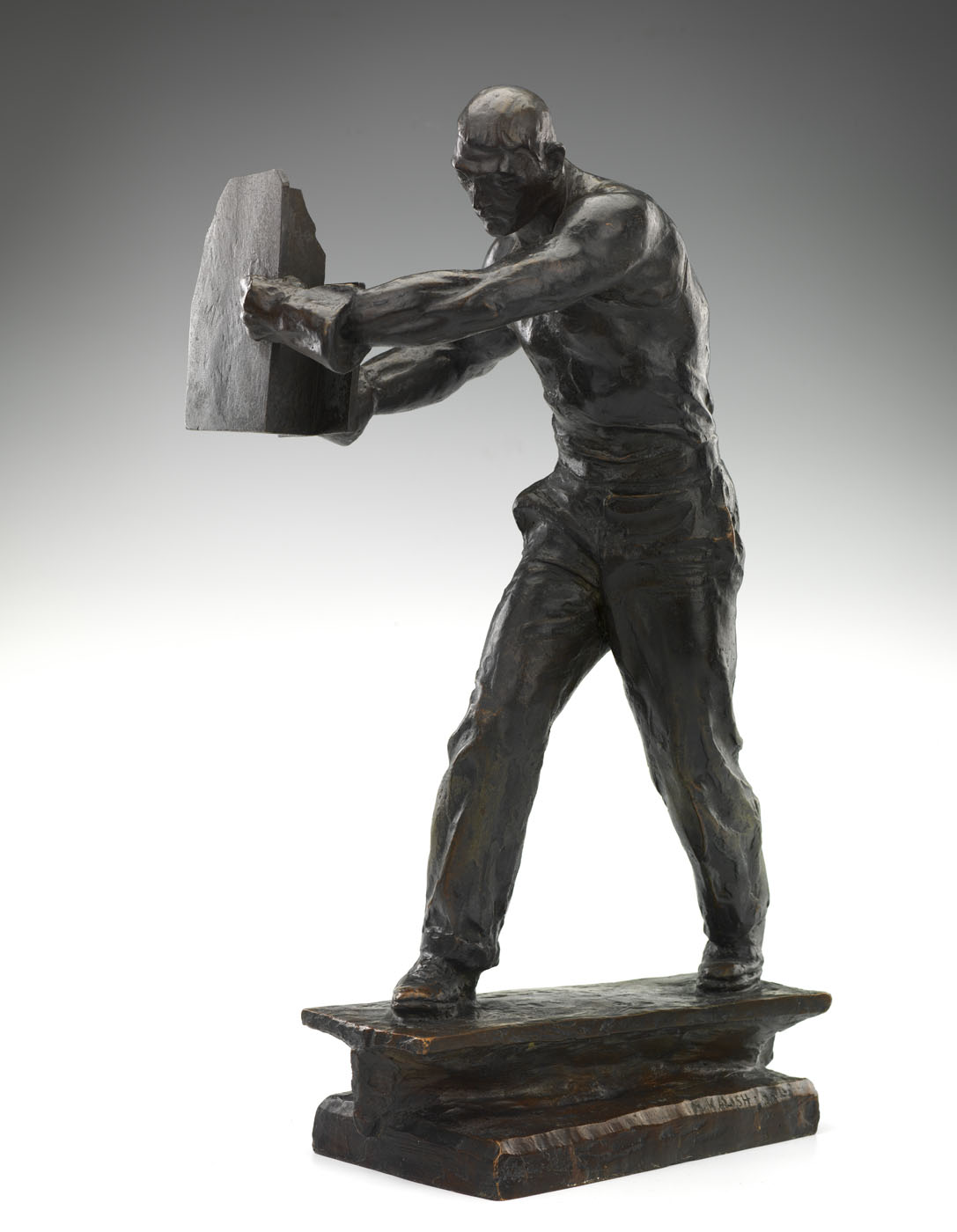
Man of Steel (before 1933), Smithsonian American Art Museum.
