= William Claude Harper =

American jeweler (born 1944)

'Ghost Oracle', gold, enamel, silver and pearls pendant brooch by William Harper, 1978, Metropolitan Museum of Art.

William C. Harper (born 1944) is an NYC based American jewelry artist known for studio craft jewelry. Harper, an expert in the cloisonné technique working in enamelled glass, creates intricate pieces that combine enamel designs with gold, wood, and a variety of other materials, both valuable and ordinary. Instead of using cloisonné in the traditional way to separate areas of color, Harper utilizes silver and gold wires as a form of drawing, creating abstract linear patterns within the enamel. His work often explores the contrast between different elements, such as the beautiful and the everyday, the luxurious and the simple, and the public and the personal.

== Biography ==
Born in Bucyrus, Ohio, in 1944. He received a BS in 1966 and an MS in education in 1967, both from Case Western Reserve University in Cleveland, Ohio. He also studied advanced enameling techniques at the Cleveland Institute of Art.

Harper began his career as an abstract painter but in the early 1960s switched to enameling. Many of his creations relate to mythology and ritual objects, and his work was included in the exhibition One of a Kind: The Studio Craft Movement at the Metropolitan Museum of Art in New York City, December 22, 2006 – September 3, 2007.

He should not be confused with the Afro-American sculptor and painter William A. Harper (1873–1910) or the American painter William St. John Harper (1851–1910).

== Work ==
Harper, a highly regarded craftsman has exhibited widely, including a one-person exhibition "William Harper: Recent Works in Enamel" (1977-1978: Washington, D.C. in 1977 at the Renwick Gallery of the Smithsonian American Art Museum in Washington, D.C., and an internationally traveling retrospective in 1989. His work is in the collections of the Metropolitan Museum of Art, the Philadelphia Art Museum, and the Museum of Fine Arts, Boston, The Victoria and Albert Museum, and The Enamel Arts Foundation among many others in the United States and Europe.

Harper was awarded a National Endowment for the Arts fellowship in 1978 and NEA grants in 1979 and 1980. In 1980 and 1985 he received fellowships from the Florida Arts Council.

In 2019, The Cleveland Institute of Art mounted a comprehensive exhibition entitled The Beautiful and the Grotesque, accompanied by a catalog in which Nikki Woods, Director of CIA's Reinberger Gallery notes that Harper's influences are broad include ancient Byzantine jewelry, Neolithic sculptures, Alexander Calder, enamel artist June Schwartz, African, Asian, and South American indigenous art, and mythological storytelling. Harper is known for his unique vision, bringing a high level of craft (a master of cloisonné technique) to his creation of two- and three-dimensional forms, but allowing for a playful experimentation working with vitreous enamel, gold wood and often distinctly non-precious materials.

== Teaching ==
Harper taught at Florida State University from 1973 to 1992. Harper published Step-by-Step Enameling: a Complete Introduction to the Craft of Enameling in 1973.

== Personal ==
On Feb. 14, 2016, William Allen Benjamin and William Claude Harper Jr. were married in Manhattan.
