= James A. Porter (novelist) =

American novelist

James A. Porter (novelist) (c. 1836-Jan. 13, 1897) was born in Bellefontaine, Logan County, Ohio. He served as a bugler and bandmaster in the U.S. Civil War. Later, he was a music teacher in Galion, Urbana, and Greenville. After he retired from teaching, he wrote a novel called A Prince of Anahuac: A Histori-Traditional Story, which was published by The Crawford Company, Galion, Ohio, in 1894.
