= Carl Gaertner =

American painter (1898 – 1952)

- Born: April 18, 1898; Cleveland, Ohio
- Died: November 4, 1952 (aged 54); Cleveland, Ohio
- Education: Cleveland School of Art, from 1920-1923 and taught there from 1925-1952
- Known for: Painting, Drawing, Sculpture, Printmaking
- Notable work: Flying Ponies

Carl Frederick Gaertner (April 18, 1898 – November 4, 1952) was an American artist.

Gaertner was born in Cleveland in 1898 and remained there until his death in 1952. He studied at the Cleveland Institute of Art, which was then called the Cleveland School of Art, from 1920–1923 and taught there from 1925-1952.

Gaertner's subject matter varied, but certain themes recur in his work, including industrial subjects, with Cleveland as his model in the early part of his career. Other themes were Provincetown, West Virginia watercolors and oils, and Chagrin Valley paintings. After 1935, Gaertner bought a farm in Chagrin Valley and began his series of paintings of that subject. Throughout the 1940s, Gaertner received recognition from prestigious art institutions such as Chicago Art Institute's Exhibition of American Painting, New York's National Academy of Design Show, and the Pepsi-Cola Show.

The Akron Art Museum currently holds three paintings by Gaertner. Featured in the McDowell galleries is Riverside Plant, an oil on canvas painted in 1927-28 which was exhibited at the Cleveland Museum of Art Annual Exhibit of the Cleveland Artists and Craftsmen from April 25-June 3, 1928. Also in the Akron collection is Summer Kitchen, a gouache on fiberboard painting done in 1947 and The Commuter, an oil on fiberboard painting done in 1945 which shows a man standing on a train platform and is based on sketches Gaertner did while riding the train to New York City to visit his art dealer.

Another well-known painting by Gaertner is Flying Ponies. It depicts a carousel at Euclid Beach Park, a Cleveland amusement park. It was displayed at the Cleveland Museum of Art's "Transformations in Cleveland Art, 1796-1946" exhibit in 1996 and was gifted to the museum in 2020.

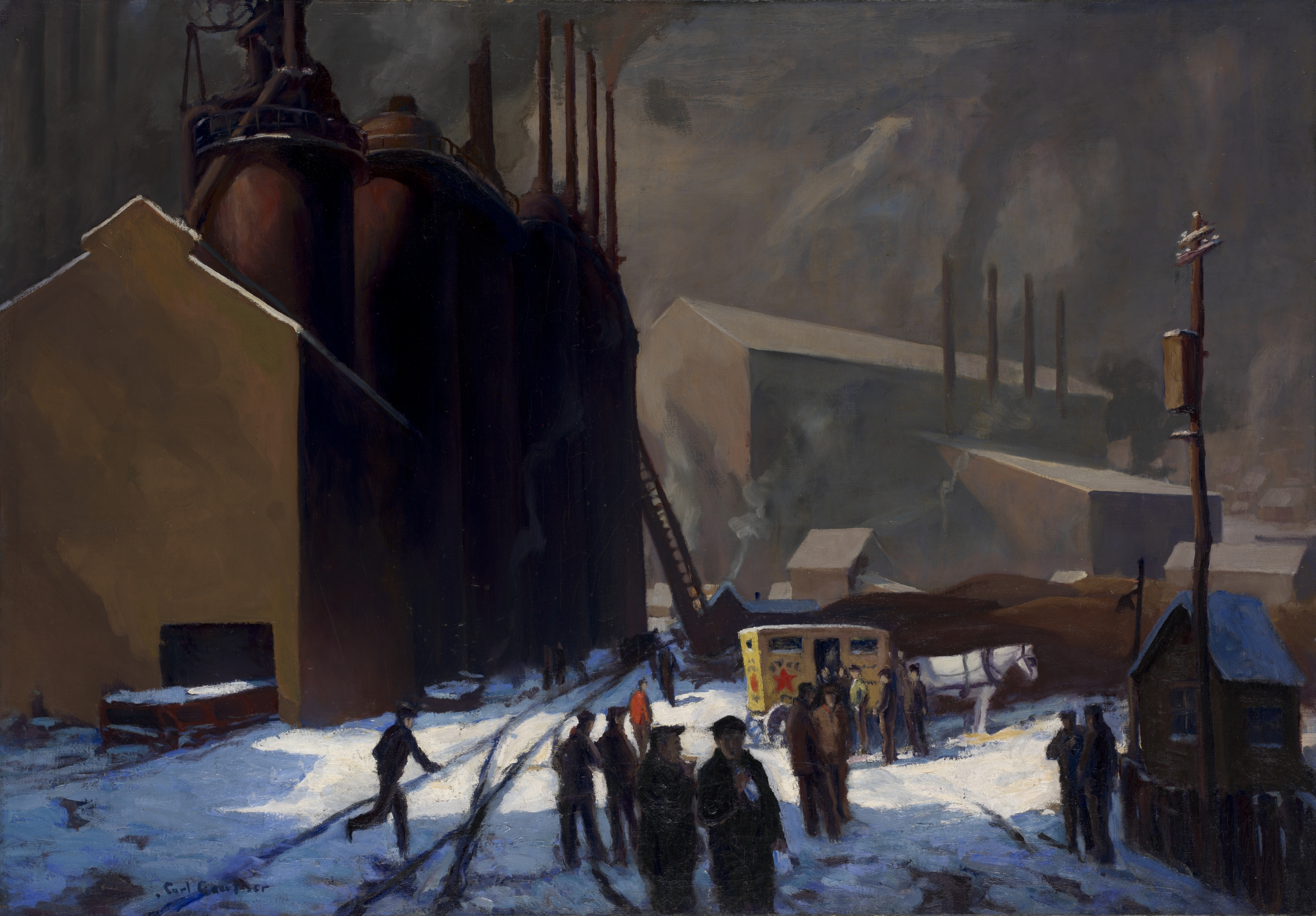
The Pie Wagon

The Cleveland Museum of Art owns several other Gaertner works, including an oil painting titled The Pie Wagon. Painted in 1926, this work focuses attention on laborers at an industrial plant who spend their lunch break milling around a horse-drawn bakery wagon in the shadows of the hulking factories.

Gaertner was an important Cleveland artist who was just achieving national acclaim before his early death at the age of 54.
