= Bookend (disambiguation) =

A bookend is an object, or often one of a pair of objects, used to hold a row of books upright on a shelf.

Bookend or Bookends may also refer to:

== Ends ==
- Bookend terrace, an architectural term for a terrace of identical houses, framed at each end by a pair of enlarged houses
- Framing device, an element of a story or musical composition occurring at its beginning and repeating at its end
- Book end vortices, vortices that form at the ends of a large storm system or derecho

== Sports ==
- "Bookend", is a nickname for rugby league football's prop position
- Book End, the finishing move of professional wrestler Booker T

== Books and media ==
- Bookstop (company), a Texas-based chain of bookstores
- Bookends, a 2002 novel by Jane Green, and spoken book read by Jacqueline King
- Bookends (radio program), a Canadian radio show hosted by Mattea Roach

== Music ==
=== Albums ===
- Bookends (album), a 1968 album by Simon & Garfunkel
- Bookend, a 2011 album by Aska
- Bookends, a 2002 jazz album by David Liebman and Marc Copland

=== Songs ===
- "Bookends" (song), a song by Simon and Garfunkel
- "Bookends", a song by Jerry Fuller, covered by Mark Lindsay
- "Bookends", or "Book Ends", a song by Joe Walsh from The Smoker You Drink, the Player You Get
- "Bookends", a song by Alfie from Bookends
- "Bookends", a song by The Boggs from Forts
- "Bookends", a song by Pullman from Viewfinder
- "Book-Ends", by Cannonball Adderley from Pyramid

== Other uses ==
- Bookends (software), reference management software for Mac OS
- BookEnds, a non-profit organization
