= Thelma Frazier Winter =

American artist

- Born: December 17, 1908; Gnadenhutten, Ohio, US
- Died: June 24, 1977 (aged 68); Cleveland Heights, Ohio, US
- Known for: Enamelist, Sculptor, and Painter

Thelma Frazier Winter (1908–1977) was an American enamelist, ceramic sculptor, and painter. She worked at Cowan Pottery and belonged to the Cleveland School of artists.

== Biography ==
Thelma Frazier was born in Gnadenhutten, Ohio, to Robert Frazier and Esther Eggenberg; her family was descended from early Moravian settlers. She grew up in New Philadelphia, Ohio. Encouraged by her mother, she went on to study at the Cleveland School of Art, where she trained in drawing, painting and design with Julius Mihalik and ceramics with R. Guy Cowan. She credited Cowan with introducing her to the medium of ceramics, telling an interviewer in 1952: “Ceramic sculpture, built directly of vitreous clay, fired and glazed, was a revolutionary idea to me. Clay, such a responsive medium, summons all one’s ingenuity and adventurous impulse. Add the dimension of color and its possibilities are really exciting. I felt at once that this was my medium.”

She completed her degree in 1929 and then worked for two years at Cowan Pottery before leaving in the early 1930s to pursue a bachelor's degree in art education at Western Reserve University. Graduating in 1935, she went on to teach at the Laurel School in Cleveland (1939–45) and the Cleveland Institute of Art (1945–50).

In December 1939, she married H. Edward Winter, who was also an artist. They were longtime residents of the University Circle neighborhood of Cleveland.

Thelma Frazier Winter died of cancer in 1977.

== Work ==
Winter became known for her polychrome ceramic work, and especially for her use of glaze and color. Her work consistently featured highly stylized human and animal figures. Her style ranged from an expressive Modernism influenced by the Wiener Werkstätte and Cubism to a cartoon-like style for some of the animal figurines. In 1939, she won the prestigious first prize for sculpture at Syracuse Museum of Fine Art’s National Ceramics Exhibition.

In 1973, she published a book, Art and Craft of Ceramic Sculpture, that introduced a new generation of American artists to the potential of her medium.

In the 1950s, Winter began working with enamels. Her husband was a well-known enamelist, and the pair worked both independently and collaboratively on projects large and small, including sizable enamel murals—including eleven commissioned by churches—and household decorative items ranging from sculptures to ashtrays. Thelma said of her enamel work: "One of the most exciting experiences of my life began when I started to work with enamels.... I could transfer all I had learned in the other mediums to my enamels so that they have a style which is completely personal."

Winter's work is part of the comprehensive ceramics collection at the Everson Museum (formerly the Syracuse Fine Arts Museum) in Syracuse, New York, originally assembled in 1916. It started with the purchase of thirty-two porcelains created by another woman artist, renowned potter Adelaïde Alsop Robineau (1865-1929) in the early 1900s. Fernando Carter, then the director, quickly expanded its scope, acquiring historic and iconic pottery works internationally. However, Carter also presented art by respected and innovative national ceramicists, including examples by Winter such as her Juggler (circa 1949).
