= Justice Center Complex =

Building complex in Cleveland, Ohio

Justice Complex Center
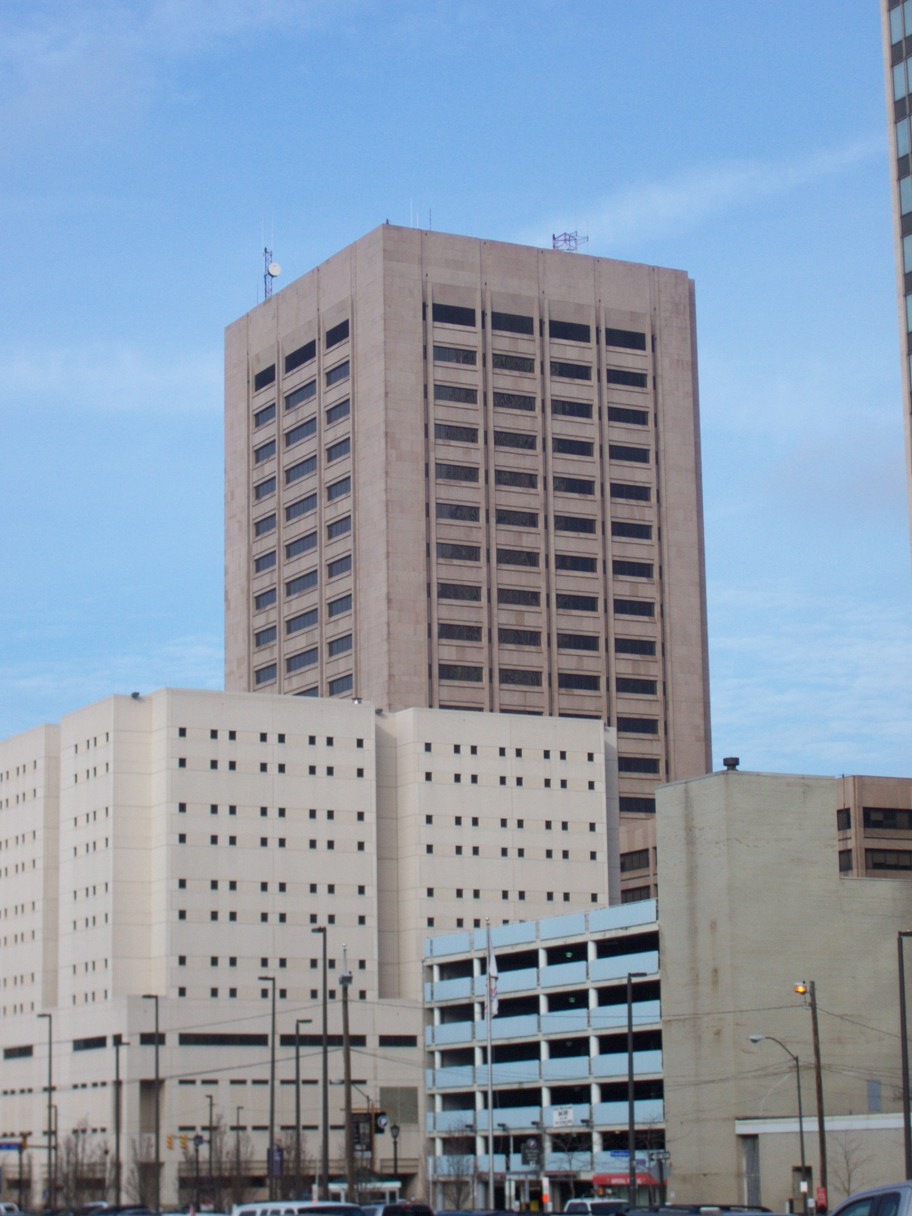
- Courts Tower (rear) and Jail II (left foreground)
- Interactive map of the Justice Complex Center area

General information
- Type: Government office building
- Architectural style: Brutalist
- Location: 1200 Ontario Street, Cleveland, Ohio, U.S., 1200 Ontario Street (Courts Tower); 1300 Ontario Street (Police); 1215 West 3rd Street (Corrections Center)
- Coordinates: 41.501664°N 81.696828°W
- Construction started: 1972
- Completed: 1976 (Courts Tower, Corrections Center, Police Headquarters); 1995 (Jail II)

Height
- Roof: 128.1 m (420 ft) (Court Towers)

Technical details
- Floor count: 25 (Courts Tower); 11 (Jail II); 10 (Corrections Center); 9 (Police Headquarters)

Design and construction
- Architects: Prindle, Patrick and Associates (Court Towers and Correction Center [Jail I]); Richard L. Bowen and Associates (Cleveland Police Headquarters); Robert P. Madison International (Jail II)

The Justice Center Complex is a building complex located in the Civic Center District in Cleveland, Ohio, in the United States. The complex consists of the Cleveland Police Headquarters Building, the Cuyahoga County and Cleveland Municipal Courts Tower, and the Correction Center (Jail I), and Jail II. It occupies a city block bounded by Lakeside Avenue, Ontario Street, West 3rd Street, and St. Clair Avenue. The Lakeside Avenue entrance faces the Cuyahoga County Court House, erected in 1912.

== Description ==
When the Justice Center was proposed in 1969, then-Mayor Carl B. Stokes did not want to be part of the Justice Center project. At the time, the Cleveland Police were at an older headquarters on East 22nd Street. In 1971, voters elected Mayor Ralph Perk, who accepted the police department recommendation to move to the proposed Justice Center. The original cost for the Justice Center was set at $60 million, but infighting between Cuyahoga County and City of Cleveland officials escalated the cost to $128 million. On October 20, 1972, ground was broken for the Justice Center. Construction was complete in 1976.

The Courts Tower component, 26 stories high, was designed by Prindle, Patrick and Associates. Jail I was built in 1976, when the rest of the construction of the complex was completed. It had 956 beds, arranged in pods of 23, and each pod was designed to take extensive advantage of natural light. The Courts Tower has been criticized by Steven Litt in The Plain Dealer as menacing, cold, and distracting.

In 1995, the Robert P. Madison International-designed, $68 million Jail II was erected on the southern corner of the block. A suburban location was considered for the facility, but county officials found it was cheaper to demolish two older structures next to the Justice Center. Jail II added 480 beds. Determined to avoid cost overruns on the structure, Jail II was left without stone cladding—which made it clash with the three buildings beside it. Jail II was harshly criticized by Steven Litt in The Plain Dealer as "straight out of 1984" and for clashing with historic structures in the nearby Warehouse District.

A four-story atrium exists in the center of the block, and serves as the secure public entry to the complex. The atrium helps resolve ground-level changes at the site, and connects the Courts Tower, Police Headquarters, and Correction Center (Jail I) structures internally. The north, south, and east walls of the atrium are glass curtain walls. An enclosed, elevated walkway connects Jail I and Jail II, while an enclosed walkway connects Cleveland Police Headquarters with Jail II.

The entire complex contains about 2,300,000 square feet (210,000 m^{2}) of interior space.

The bases of both the Cleveland Police Headquarters and the Correction Center are deeply recessed with a regular spacing of bays and perimeter columns. Bronze tinted glass enhances the play of shadow upon the surface of the structures.

Cleveland Police Headquarters and the atrium are set much further back from Ontario Street than the Courts Tower. An open paved plaza occupies this space. Located at the northwestern end of this plaza is the Isamu Noguchi sculpture, Portal, donated by the Gund Foundation in 1977. The $100,000, 36-foot (11 m) high sculpture was cast by the Patterson-Leitch Company of Cleveland. It is one of Isamu Noguchi's famous sculptures, and the most recognizable symbol of the Justice Center. One Cleveland art critic said Portal looked like "justice going down the drain". But artist John Clague highly praised it, and sculptor Clement Meadmore says it is Noguchi's best work.

=== Renovations ===
The granite veneer of the Courts Tower, Police Headquarters, and Corrections Center underwent a $3.2 million refurbishment in 1995.

A $13 million renovation of the Corrections Center and Jail II was completed in 1999. The renovations increased the capacity of Jail I to 1,749 beds.

== Future of the Justice Complex ==
In 2013, Cuyahoga County officials commissioned a study from Osborn Engineering to assess the condition of the Justice Center Complex. The report, issued in spring 2014, found that the Justice Center Complex was in significant disrepair. The study cited significant architectural and construction issues which have affected the longevity of the three original structures, and Cuyahoga County Public Works Director Michael Dever said the electrical system, plumbing, elevators, and HVAC system all need replacing. The structures also have little capacity for modern communications and computer systems (such as broadband telecommunications), and currently systems are installed in insecure or temporary fashions. The buildings were not constructed to accommodate Wi-Fi or mobile phones, neither of which can be accommodated in many parts of the complex. The cost of renovation was pegged at a minimum of $300 million. The Osborn Engineering report estimated the cost of new construction at $429 million, which involved demolishing the Cleveland police headquarters and the Courts Tower and constructing one or two new buildings in their place.

County officials came to the preliminary conclusion that the Justice Complex should be demolished, and a new "justice center" erected elsewhere in downtown Cleveland. Cuyahoga County Council member Michael Gallagher told The Plain Dealer newspaper that advances in corrections design made the existing Corrections Center/Jail I significantly outdated. He also claimed that renovations could not correct the design and other deficiencies of the buildings. But county officials emphasized that no alternative site had been identified, and no budget proposals or even preliminary architectural discussions had occurred.

== In popular culture ==
The Justice Center Complex plays an important role in the third season of the podcast Serial. The season opens with a general description of day-to-day lives inside the complex and then focuses on specific felony cases being handled and occasionally tried in the building. Several of the audio recordings take place inside the complex and feature the host, Sarah Koenig, discussing and interviewing those involved in the cases.

The Complex is seen in several shots in Captain America: The Winter Soldier (2014), when Bucky Barnes is attempting to assassinate Black Widow and Captain America.

A courtroom set for the 2020 Hulu miniseries Little Fires Everywhere, involving a Cuyahoga County court battle, recreates the slatted wooden walls of Justice Center courtrooms.

== See also ==
- List of tallest buildings in Cleveland
