= John Clague =

John Clague may refer to:

- John Clague (physician) (1842–1908), Manx physician
- John Clague (artist) (1928–2004), American artist
- John J. Clague (born 1946), Canadian geologist
