= Matsuri Con =

Matsuri Con may stand for:

- Anime Matsuri, an anime convention held in Texas
- Matsuricon, an anime convention held in Ohio
