= Bookend =

Object used to support a row of books

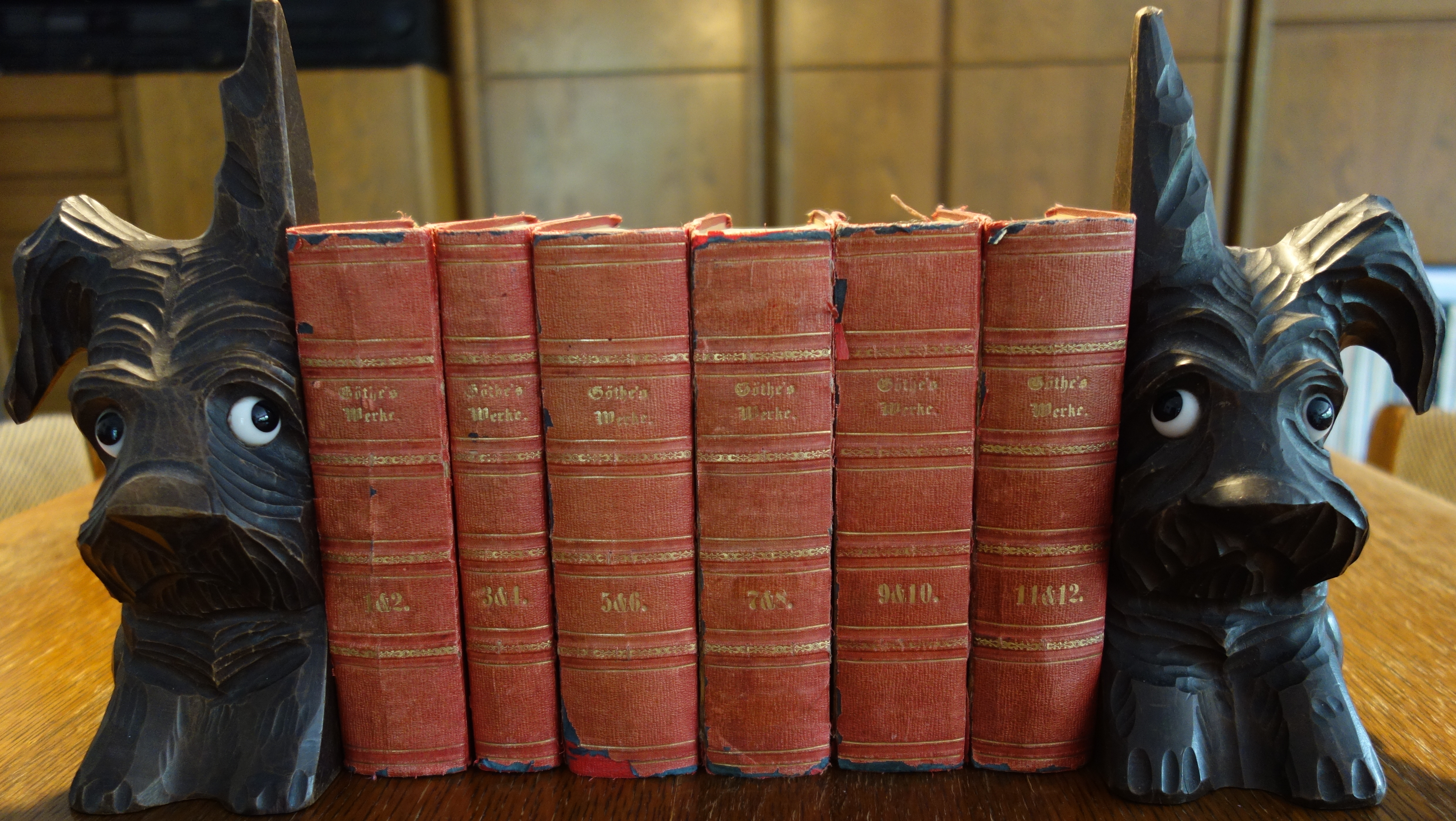
A pair of hand-carved bookends depicting two dogs

A bookend is an object tall, sturdy, and heavy enough that is placed at either end of a row of upright books to support or buttress them. Bookends have been made from materials including wood, stone, cast iron, bronze, copper, chrome, ceramic and glass, and improvised objects such as bricks are also used. The simple sheetmetal bookend (originally patented in 1877 by William Stebbins Barnard) uses the weight of the books standing on its foot to clamp the bookend's tall brace against the last book's back. In libraries, simple metal brackets are often used to support the end of a row of books. Elaborate and decorative bookends are common as elements in home decor, and may display or represent elements of the contents of the books they support. The word "bookend" is also used metaphorically to refer to any pair of similar things that mark a beginning and an end.

== History ==
French gilt bronze and granite bookends, about 1780, in the Cooper Hewitt, Smithsonian Design Museum

Pairs of objects made to hold books upright existed in Europe by the late 18th century. The Cooper Hewitt, Smithsonian Design Museum holds a pair of French gilt bronze and granite bookends dated about 1780, and the Metropolitan Museum of Art has an earthenware lustreware bookend made in Staffordshire for the American market between 1800 and 1830. In 1877 William Stebbins Barnard of Canton, Illinois, received a United States patent for a "book support or holder composed of two unconnected angular end pieces", each held in place by the books standing on its base. The patent suggested making the upright piece of carved wood, papier-mâché, molded sawdust or metal, or making the whole end piece from one piece of bent metal. Merriam-Webster dates the first known use of the noun "bookend" to 1907.

Bookend manufacturing expanded in the 1920s, when many of the foundries that made doorstops also made bookends. During the Arts and Crafts movement, artisans made bookends by hand from copper or clay, sometimes as part of a desk set with a pen rest, blotter ends, stamp box and lamp. Examples in museum collections include hand-hammered copper bookends from the Roycroft shop in East Aurora, New York, attributed to Karl Kipp; glazed ceramic bookends by Rookwood Pottery; and silver and enamel bookends of about 1927 by the Boston metalsmith and enameller Rebecca Cauman, which the Metropolitan Museum of Art describes as the only known silver versions of a design that also survives in copper. In England, embossed and painted leather bookends with Islamic-inspired motifs were made in the 1920s at Studland Art Industries in Dorset, one of many small workshops founded by followers of the Arts and Crafts tradition.

Cast-iron bookends of the period depicted subjects such as the Lincoln Monument, the Liberty Bell and Rodin's The Thinker. The Bradley & Hubbard Manufacturing Company of Meriden, Connecticut, made cast-iron bookends around 1920 depicting a bust of Shakespeare, the Temple of Isis and other subjects, several of which are in the Smithsonian Institution's Castle Collection.

Ceramic bookends designed by Albert Drexler Jacobson for Cowan Pottery, 1929

Art Deco and modernist designs were applied to bookends in the 1920s and 1930s. Albert Drexler Jacobson designed cog-like ceramic bookends for Cowan Pottery in 1929, "transforming the machine aesthetic into a decorative element". In England, Harold Stabler designed a stoneware bookend in the form of a sailing galleon for Carter, Stabler & Adams of Poole around 1930, and Keith Murray designed a stepped, matt green earthenware bookend for Wedgwood around 1935. In New York, Arthur von Frankenberg patented a bookend design in 1931 that he assigned to Frankart, Inc. Firms such as Frankart and Armor Bronze sold bookends, lamps and other decorative metalwork mainly to middle-class customers by catalogue; the Modern Literature and Culture Research Centre at Toronto Metropolitan University describes such firms as "a principal avenue for the wide dissemination of trends arising from the avant-garde". More recent bookends in museum collections include a pair made in 2015–2016 by the Granby Workshop, a social enterprise set up in Liverpool by the collective Assemble, from "Granby Rock", which is cast from brick, slate and stone discarded during the refurbishment of houses in the Granby Four Streets.

== Collecting ==
Antique and vintage bookends are collected. In 1985 Ralph and Terry Kovel first gave bookends a separate listing in their annual Antiques and Collectibles Price List, and by 1998 their price list included a pair of pelican bookends made by Edgar Brandt in 1925 at $6,000. Reference books for collectors include Bookend Revue (1996) by Robert L. Seecof, Donna Lee Seecof and Louis Kuritzky; Gerald McBride's A Collector's Guide to Cast Metal Bookends (1997); and Kuritzky's Collector's Guide to Bookends (1998) and Collector's Encyclopedia of Bookends (2005). The Bookend Collectors Club held its convention in Atlantic City in 2005, at the time of the Atlantique City antiques show.

== In art ==
Books & Bookends: Sculptural Approaches, an exhibition curated by Carol Barton and Henry Barrow, toured from 1989 to 1991. In 2010 lawyers for Jeff Koons sent cease-and-desist letters to the Toronto manufacturer Imm-Living and the San Francisco gallery and store Park Life, saying that resin bookends shaped like balloon dogs infringed Koons's rights in his Balloon Dog sculptures. Park Life sued for a declaration that it was not infringing, and in February 2011 Koons's company agreed not to pursue either business so long as the bookends were not presented as Koons's work.

Bookends (2009) by Mark Jenkins

== See also ==
- Bookend terrace
- Book nook
