= Ramnarace =

Ramnarace is a surname. Notable people with the surname include:

- Randolph Ramnarace (born 1941), Guyanese cricketer
- Sid Ramnarace (born 1973), Canadian designer
- Ramnarace family (died 2022), Belizean crime victims
