= Charles Fergus Binns =

English-born studio potter

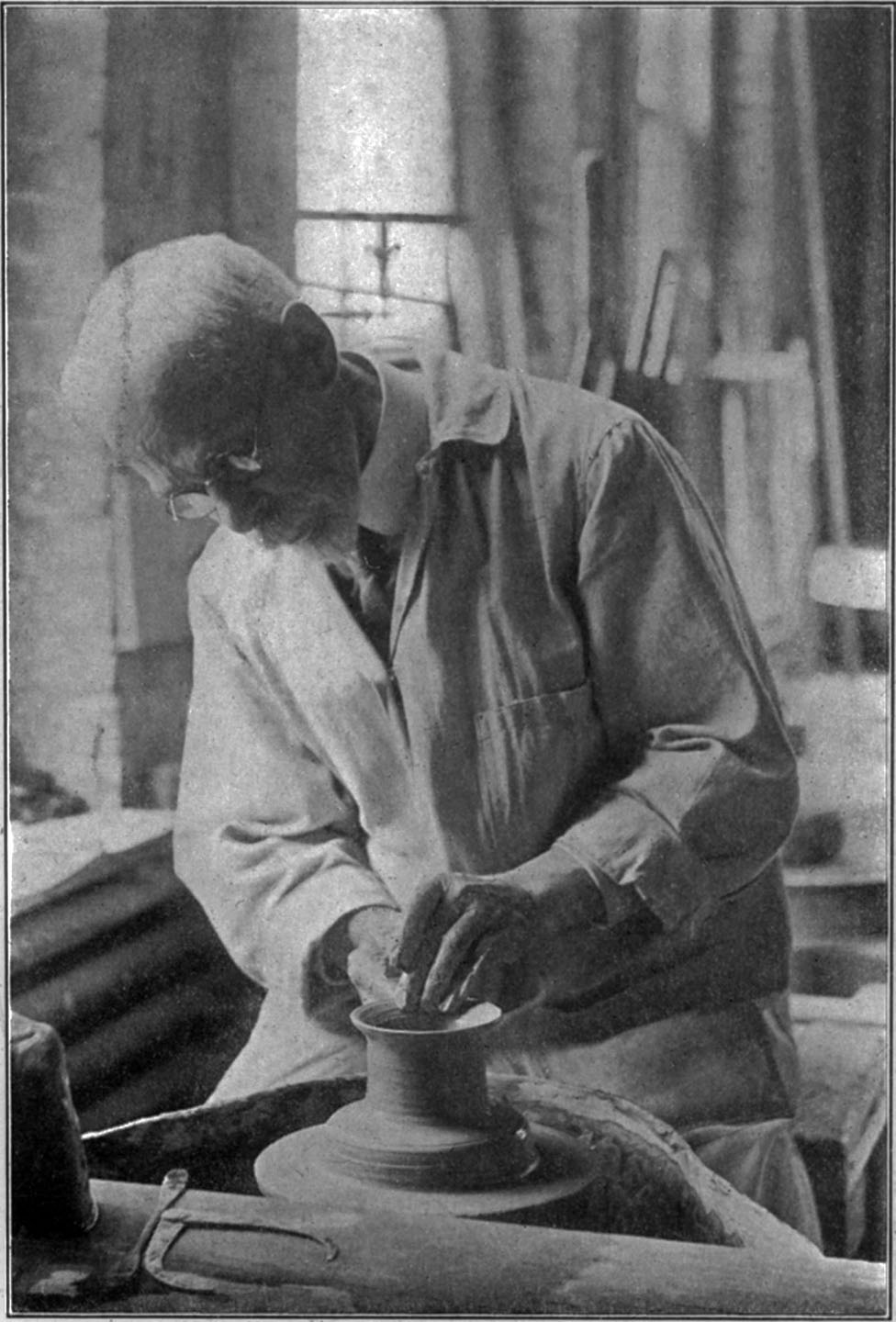
Charles Fergus Binns working on the potter's wheel. From The Potter's Craft (1910)

Charles Fergus Binns (4 October 1857 in Worcester – 4 December 1934 in Alfred, New York) was an English-born studio potter. Binns was the first director of the New York State School of Clayworking and Ceramics at Alfred University, holding that position from 1900 until 1931.

His work included authorship of several books on the history and practice of pottery. Some of his more notable students included Arthur Eugene Baggs, William Victor Bragdon, R. Guy Cowan, Maija Grotell, Elizabeth Overbeck, and Adelaide Alsop Robineau. This has led Binns to be called "the father of American studio ceramics".

== Biography ==
=== Early life ===
Charles Fergus Binns was born on 4 October 1857, in Worcester, England, the seventh of ten children. His father, Richard William Binns was art director and co-managing director of the Royal Worcester Porcelain Works.

Binns attended the Worcester Cathedral King's School from 1869 to 1872. At the age of 14, he was apprenticed at the Royal Worcester Porcelain Works, where he was exposed to every aspect of the pottery business. His education continued while he worked at the pottery and he studied art at the Worcester School of Design, and studied chemistry in nearby Birmingham. Binns worked for Royal Worcester for the next 25 years eventually becoming the head of the sales office, first in Worcester and beginning in 1884, in London. He became known as a popular lecturer on the subject of ceramics and began writing on the topic.

In 1893 he travelled to the United States, accompanying the Royal Worcester exhibit at the World's Columbian Exhibition in Chicago, Illinois. After returning to England he became technical director for the pottery, holding that position for four more years. Binns resigned his position at Royal Worcester in 1897 when his father retired.

=== American period ===
After leaving Royal Worcester Binns emigrated to America. After several months of travelling and giving lectures on ceramics while looking for a position, he became principal director of the Technical School for Sciences and Art in Trenton, New Jersey, and in 1898 began working for the Ceramic Art Company in Trenton. At this time, Binns became one of the founding members of the American Ceramic Society.

In 1900, Binns became the first director of the New York State School of Clay-Working and Ceramics at Alfred University. Under Binns's leadership, the reputation of the school at Alfred grew significantly.

== Ceramic technique ==
Binns's ceramic technique focused on the vessel as a utilitarian object. His work include vases, urns, and bowls. Binns threw each piece in three forms on a wheel, turning them on a lathe and piecing them together afterwards. One of the concepts Binns taught was 'dead ground', in which aspects of making that could not be precisely controlled, such as firing temperature or glaze calculations, were mitigated by control over glaze placement - e.g., glaze was to run to a certain point but not to encroach on the foot.

Binns wrote of the artistic limitations of china-painting, which many amateur artists, mainly women, practiced at the time. He argued that “no-one with a spark of artistic fire can be content to copy the design of another or to merely add the finishing touches to work begun in a factory”, and that this feeling has caused china-painting to give place to pottery-making, in which, from “the consciousness of honest effort”, the artist experiences liberation. His book The Potter's Craft (1910) may have given rise to the first use of the phrase “studio pottery”. In it Binns referred to "studio work" and the "artist potter", and a review of it in Adelaide Alsop Robineau's magazine Keramic Studio referred to “studio pottery”.

As a critic and influential educator in the ceramic field, his praise of utilitarian wares with artistic quality led the Arts and Crafts movement in American studio pottery.

== Influence ==
Binns authored several books about ceramics. Among these was The Story of the Potter published by George Newnes in 1901, prior to his position at as director of the New York State School of Clayworking and Ceramics. He was an avid contributor to Keramic Studio.

Binns had had a significant effect on the development of the studio ceramics movement in the United States, and is thus known as the father of American studio ceramics.

== Collections ==
Examples of Binns's work can be found in museums around the world, including:

- Alfred Ceramic Art Museum, Alfred University, Alfred, NY
- Art Institute of Chicago, IL
- Los Angeles County Museum of Art, CA
- Metropolitan Museum of Art, New York, NY
- Museum of Contemporary Craft, Portland, OR
- Museum of Fine Arts, Boston, MA
- National Museum of American History, Smithsonian Institution, Washington, DC
