= Sinz =

Sinz may refer to:

== Places ==
- Sinz, district of Perl, Saarland, Germany

== People ==
- Egon Sinz (born 1928), Austrian psychologist and researcher
- Elmar Sinz (born 1951), German Professor of business informatics
- Herbert Sinz (1913–1989), German historian and author
- Walter Sinz (1881–1966), American sculptor
