= Ralph and Terry Kovel =

American authors and antiquarians

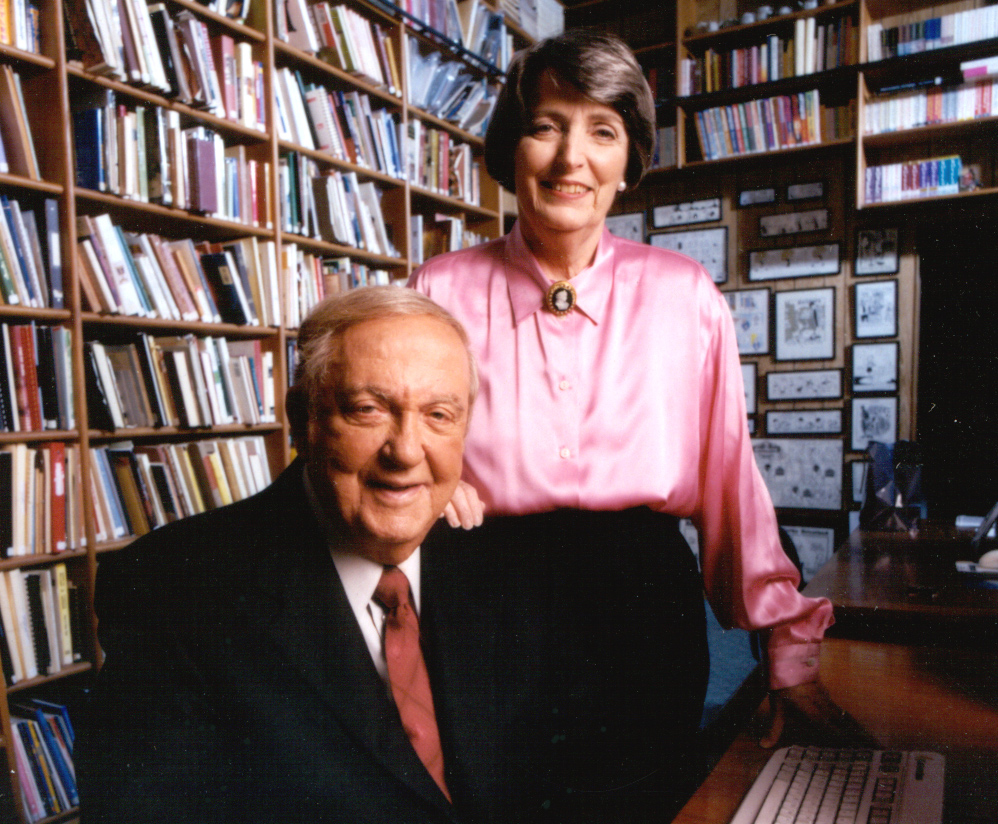
Ralph and Terry Kovel

Ralph Mallory Kovel (20 August 1920 – 28 August 2008) was an American author of 97 books and guides to antiques, co-authored with his wife, Terry Kovel (b. 1928). They wrote a nationally syndicated collectibles column that began in 1955, which is still in production as of 2022.

== Ralph Kovel ==
Ralph Kovel (/koʊˈvɛlˈ/) was born in Milwaukee, Wisconsin, in 1920. His family moved to Paducah, Kentucky, then Cleveland, Ohio, in the 1930s. He graduated from Cleveland Heights High School, then attended Ohio State University. He joined the United States Coast Guard during World War II. In 1950 he married Terry Horvitz. Their children are Lee Kovel and Kim Kovel. He started his writing career with Terry in 1953 (see section Ralph and Terry Kovel). In the 1950s, he was in the export-import business and imported a variety of things, including the Lambretta motor scooter, the new bikini bathing suits European women were wearing, and specialty food products. He didn't like the constant travel, so he started his own business as a food broker, representing packaged foods and other products to grocery-store chains, and fast-food restaurants. He represented many of the new frozen food lines, like Stouffers, specialty items like Sweet and Low packets, and even live, bare-root fruit trees. Ralph sold McDonald's fresh potatoes in 1956 by the carload when hamburgers were 15 cents and the chain said they would never use frozen French fries. He bought a small salad dressing company in Cleveland named Sar-a-Lee and soon was selling custom-made dressings to major fast-food chains for their newly popular salad bars. In 1987 his company was purchased Sara Lee Corporation. and he became a senior vice president in the foods division.

In 1970 Ralph started U.S. Brands, Inc., a fulfillment company that did packaging and handling for the Kovel's books and newsletters as well as for many other businesses. He became part owner of an innovative aquaculture shrimp farm in the Bahamas in 1996.

Ralph was a salesman, an innovator, and an entrepreneur. He patented a dripless aluminum teabag called the teastir, and made an instant silver polish. When his children chewed the paper straws in their milkshakes, he developed the first plastic straw for McDonald's by using the outer part of a plastic clothes line. He was a dedicated volunteer, working as a group leader and board member at a settlement house, a volunteer for public television, and a committee member for the Cleveland United Appeal. He even helped plan and cook fundraising spaghetti dinners.

Ralph continued working until the week before his final illness. Kovel resided in Shaker Heights, Ohio and died in Cleveland of complications from a broken hip in August 2008.

CLUBS

- Oakwood Country Club, Cleveland, Ohio
- Union League Club, Chicago, Illinois

Board memberships

- Board of Trustees - Cleveland Pops Orchestra.
- Board of Trustees – WVIZ/PBS and 90.3 WCPN Ideastream
- Board of Trustees - Western Reserve Historical Society, 1994 - 2008
- Board Member - Society of Collectors

== Terry Kovel ==
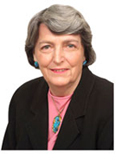
Terry Kovel

Terry was born in Cleveland, Ohio, in 1928. She earned a bachelor's degree from Wellesley College, Wellesley, Mass. In 1950 she married Ralph Kovel. Their children are Lee Kovel and Kim Kovel.

Terry started her writing career with her husband, Ralph, in 1953 (see section Ralph and Terry Kovel). Terry was a reading specialist and mathematics teacher at Hawken School, Lyndhurst, Ohio, from 1961 to 1971. She took specialized courses, including "How to Teach New Math," at the University of Illinois, and studied American antiques at the Winterthur Museum Summer Institute.

Terry Kovel has been a volunteer since she was a teenager. She was a group leader for girls at East End Neighborhood House in the 1950s, an appraiser and advisor for many non-profit antique-related projects, and an auctioneer, appraiser, and go-getter at public television fundraisers. She has been active in many civic gardening projects, both digging and helping with fundraisers. She has served on the Ohio Historic Preservation Committee and has been a board member of the Cleveland Chapter of the Council of Jewish Women, the Catholic DePaul Infant and Maternity Home, and Hiram College. She is on the boards of WVIZ/PBS and 90.3 WCPN Ideastream and the Shaker Historical Society and is an honorary trustee of Hiram College, and Chairperson of Cleveland's Euclid Beach Park Carousel Society.

== Books and other published writing ==
The first Kovel book was written in 1952–53. Ralph and Terry were living in an apartment with their young son, Lee (and with a breakfront full of their collection of English 18th-century porcelains). Their daughter, Kim, was born the day the first copy of Ralph and Terry's first book, Dictionary of Marks: Pottery and Porcelain arrived by mail. That book, now titled Kovels' Dictionary of Marks: Pottery and Porcelain, 1650–1850, remains in print. In 1986 they updated their information about marks with a new book, Kovels New Dictionary of Marks: Pottery and Porcelain, 1850 to the Present.

In 1953 the Kovels started writing a question and answer column for The Cleveland Press. It was syndicated in 1955 with Register and Tribune Syndicate and was soon running in 100 newspapers. When the Cleveland Press closed in 1982 the Cleveland Plain Dealer began to run the Kovels' column. "Kovels: Antiques and Collecting" is now (2021) the longest-running U.S. syndicated column written by the original bylined author. It is distributed by King Features Syndicate to over 120 newspapers nationwide and online. In October 2010, Ralph and Terry Kovel were inducted into the Cleveland Journalism Hall of Fame.

In 1967 The Kovels wrote Kovels' Know Your Antiques, an easy-to-read book for collectors filled with marks, dates, and helpful information. The next year they decided that an up-to-date book listing prices for antiques was needed. They used the latest technology, keypunch cards and that modern invention, the computer. The cards were punched, corrected, sorted by hand (there was no sorting machine), and printed on the white side of green bar paper used for accounting. The system used the only available typeface and no pictures. The white pages were reproduced to create the book, so the time to complete the book was speeded up by six months. It is said to be the first "bookstore" book done on a computer. The Complete Antiques Price List has been published every year for over sixty years with changes and improvements. The title is now Kovels' Antiques and Collectibles Price Guide. It has color photographs, paragraphs of information, marks, a computer-generated index, a listing of record prices for the past year, tips on care, and 40,000 prices for pieces sold in the previous 12 months. Over four million copies of the book have been sold since the first edition. Other books followed (see list below) and the Kovels 100th book was published in September 2011.

- Dictionary of Marks: Pottery and Porcelain (1953)
- Directory of American Silver, Pewter and Silver Plate (1958)
- American Country Furniture 1780-1875 (1965)
- Kovels' Know Your Antiques (1967, 1973, 1981, 1990)
- Kovels' Collectors' Guide to American Art Pottery (1974)
- Kovels' Collectors' Guide to Limited Editions (1974)
- Kovels' Price Guide for Collector Plates, Figurines, Paperweights and Other Limited Edition Items (1978)
- Kovels' Organizer for Collectors (1978, 1983)
- Kovels' Illustrated Price Guide to Royal Doulton (1980, 1984)
- Kovels' Know Your Collectibles (1981, 1992)
- Kovels' Book of Antique Labels (1982)
- Kovels' Collectors' Source Book (1983)
- Kovels' New Dictionary of Marks: Pottery and Porcelain, 1850-Present (1985)
- Kovels' Advertising Collectibles Price List (1986, 2005)
- Kovels' Guide to Selling Your Antiques & Collectibles (1987, 1990)
- Kovels' American Silver Marks, 1650 to the Present (1989)
- Kovels' Antiques & Collectibles Fix-It Source Book (1990)
- Kovels' American Art Pottery (1993)
- Kovels' Dictionary of Marks: Pottery and Porcelain, 1650 to 1850 (1995)
- Kovels' Guide to Selling, Buying, and Fixing Your Antiques and Collectibles (1995)
- Kovels' Quick Tips: 799 Helpful Hints on How to Care for Your Collectibles (1995)
- The Label Made Me Buy It (1998)
- Kovels' Yellow Pages: A Resource Guide for Collectors (1999, 2003)
- Kovels' Bid, Buy, and Sell Online (2001)
- Kovels' American Antiques, 1750-1900 (2004)
- Kovels' Depression Glass & Dinnerware Price List, 8th edition (2004)
- Kovels' Bottles Price List, 13th edition (2006)
- Kovels' American Collectibles, 1900-2000 (2007)
- Kovels' Antiques & Collectibles Price Guide, 1st (1969) to 54th ed. (2022)

== Other published works: newsletter ==
The newsletter, “Kovels on Antiques and Collectibles,” was introduced in 1974. It is a 12-page subscription-only newsletter that had over 200,000 subscribers by the early 1990s. “Kovels On Antiques & Collectibles” is available in print and as a PDF for Kovels.com members. The newsletter has kept up with the times both in technology and content. Photos went from black and white to color in 1996, but there are still reports of sales and auctions, lists of current prices, tips on care, news "hotlines," reports of fakes, and many comments on events and market trends by the Kovels.

== Other writings ==
- 1979–2000, "Ask the Experts," a monthly column in House Beautiful magazine
- 1995–2003, "Antiques and Collectibles" section for the Encyclopædia Britannica Yearbook
- 2000–2002, "The Kovels on Collecting,” a monthly column about antiques in Forbes magazine
- 1992–present, Many Buying Guides and Special Reports that include hard-to-find identification clues for collectors. Subjects have included jewelry, pottery, Handbags, woodblock prints, and more.
- Kovels’ Buyers’ Guide to 20th-Century Costume Jewelry Part 1 & 2
- Kovels’ Buyers Guide to Modern Ceramics
- Kovels’ Flea Market Strategies: How to Shop, Buy, and Bargain the 21st-Century Way
- Kovels’ A Diary: How to Sell, Settle, and Profit from a Collector's Estate
- Kovels’ Collectors Guide to Handbags
- Kovels’ Identification Guide to Contemporary American Pottery. 1960s to Present.

The Kovels have written articles for many magazines, including Forbes, Boardroom Reports, House Beautiful, Family Circle, Woman's Day, Redbook, Town and Country, Giftware News, and various antiques-oriented publications.

== Television ==
Ralph and Terry Kovel started appearing on television in 1969, when their shows were made on film with one camera and no editing. The first series of 10 half-hour shows with no commercial breaks was produced by WVIZ, the Cleveland public television station. Twenty-six shows were made by 1972 and distributed nationally. Since 1969, the Kovels emceed an annual televised auction to benefit WVIZ. Other TV series include:

- 1981: Kovels on Collecting, a nationally syndicated commercial TV "filler" of 75-second spots
- 1987: Kovels on Collecting, 13 half-hour shows on public television, awarded a local Emmy
- 1989-1992: Collector's Journal with Ralph and Terry Kovel, 26 shows shown on the Discovery Channel
- 2000-2004: Flea Market Finds with the Kovels, weekly half-hour shows on Home & Garden Television Network (HGTV), awarded a Telly Guest appearance as antiques and collectibles experts on many national talk shows, news shows, and cable programs

== Lectures ==
Ralph and Terry Kovel have lectured to audiences in museums, historical societies, department stores, home and garden shows, antique shows, colleges, and charitable fundraisers.

== Website ==
The Kovels online presence began in 1996. Their website was created in 1998. It lists over a million actual prices for antiques and collectibles from the United States, Canada, and Europe, individually reviewed by experts. The website offers news, identification information, readers’ questions with expert answers, a database of factory marks, pictures, and community features like forums, calendar of events, business directory with antique-related services and more. It includes a weekly eNewsletter ("Kovels Komments"), and other free information, as well as the subscription print newsletter, a paid membership subscription to the website and other buying guides and publications from the Kovels. It has hundreds of thousands of unique visitors each month.

== Odd facts about the Kovels ==
The Kovels acquired an 18,000-volume library about antiques. They also have an 1890s "general store" collection in their basement.

Ralph and Terry met on a double-blind date. He was the other girl's date.

The Kovels' Antiques & Collectibles Price Guide was mentioned in newspaper reports as a research book used by a real thief in a murder and antiques theft case that made national news. It was also used by a thief in an Elmore Leonard murder mystery, Gold Coast, and in at least five other murder mysteries.

A shopping trip with the Kovels was offered once as a prize by the Publishers Clearing House Sweepstakes.

Roy Lichtenstein hung Ralph and Terry's drapes in the 1950s, before he became a famous artist. Ralph and Terry never bought any of his modern paintings.

They have met, and were interviewed by, many collector-celebrities including: Oprah Winfrey, Martha Stewart Merv Griffin, and Pat Robertson. Ralph was on a first-name-basis with many food celebrities, including Ray Kroc, founder of the McDonald's chain, Colonel Sanders of KFC, and Dave Thomas of Wendy's.

The Kovel newspaper column helped to find a missing inkwell needed for the United States Supreme Court in 1994.

Viktor Schreckengost, who made the famous Jazz bowl, an art deco masterpiece, was a local friend who lived nearby.

The Kovels collected a variety of items from American art pottery to Holt Howard ceramics to printed textiles to furniture and enamels. One of their more unusual collections, produce stickers like the ones on bananas that say "4011," the Universal Price Code for standard yellow bananas.

== Other ==
Ralph and Terry Kovel have been senior members of the American Society of Appraisers and have served as expert witnesses in court cases. They have taught adult education classes at Case Western Reserve University and John Carroll University.
