= Edris Eckhardt =

American artist

- Born: Edythe Eckhardt; January 28, 1905; Cleveland, Ohio
- Died: April 27, 1998 (aged 93); Cleveland Heights, Ohio
- Education: Cleveland School of Art
- Known for: Ceramic art, glass sculpture
- Movement: Cleveland School
- Awards: John Simon Guggenheim Awards for Fine Arts, 1955 and 1959; Louis Comfort Tiffany Fellowship, 1956; Cleveland Arts Prize Special Citation for Distinguished Service to the Arts, 1971
- Patron(s): Cowan Pottery, Public Works of Art Project

Edris Eckhardt (January 28, 1905 – April 27, 1998) was an American artist associated with the Cleveland School. She is known for her work in Ceramic art and glass sculpture, her work with the Works Projects Administration's (WPA) Federal Arts Project of Cleveland, and her teaching.

== Biography ==
Born in Cleveland, Ohio, Eckhardt attended the Cleveland School of Art (now Cleveland Institute of Art) from 1928 to 1932 on a scholarship, studying at the same time as ceramicist and industrial designer Viktor Schreckengost. While still a student, she was employed as an artist and designer at the noted Cleveland ceramics firm Cowan Pottery. After graduating, she established a ceramic studio, specializing in glaze chemistry. Early in her career she changed her first name from Edith to the more androgynous Edris in order to counter bias against female artists.

The WPA's Federal Arts Project funded much of her artistic output during the 1930s. She created a series of ceramic sculpture illustrating children’s literature for public libraries thanks to grants from the Public Works of Art Project. In 1935, Eckhardt was appointed director of the Ceramics and Sculpture division of the WPA's Federal Arts Project of Cleveland and served until 1942.

During the 1930s, Eckhardt’s ceramics were exhibited widely. She showed at the Cleveland Museum of Art in each of its annual May Show’s from 1933 to 1945, and in 1947, she showed her major piece "Painted Mask" in the May exhibit. She also showed at the 1939 Golden Gate Exposition in San Francisco and in the 1939 New York World's Fair.

After World War II, Eckhardt explored glass making—rediscovering an ancient Egyptian technique of fusing gold leaf between sheets of glass—and eventually bronze casting. Her work in studio glass garnered her two John Simon Guggenheim Awards for Fine Arts (1956, 1959) and the Louis Comfort Tiffany Fellowship in 1956. While her early career was focused on ceramics, her 1971 Cleveland Arts Prize Special Citation for Distinguished Service to the Arts highlighted her pioneering role in the field of glass sculpture.

Throughout her career, Eckhardt taught at the university level. She began teaching ceramics at the Cleveland School of Art in 1932 serving on the faculty for the following 30 years. She held teaching positions at Cleveland College from 1940 to 1956, Western Reserve University from 1947 to 1957, University of California, Berkeley from 1962 to 1963, and Notre Dame College from 1950 to 1970. Along with her formal teaching, Eckhardt educated the public on ceramics in articles for Ceramics Monthly starting in 1954.
