= Book nook =

Miniature diorama placed on a bookshelf

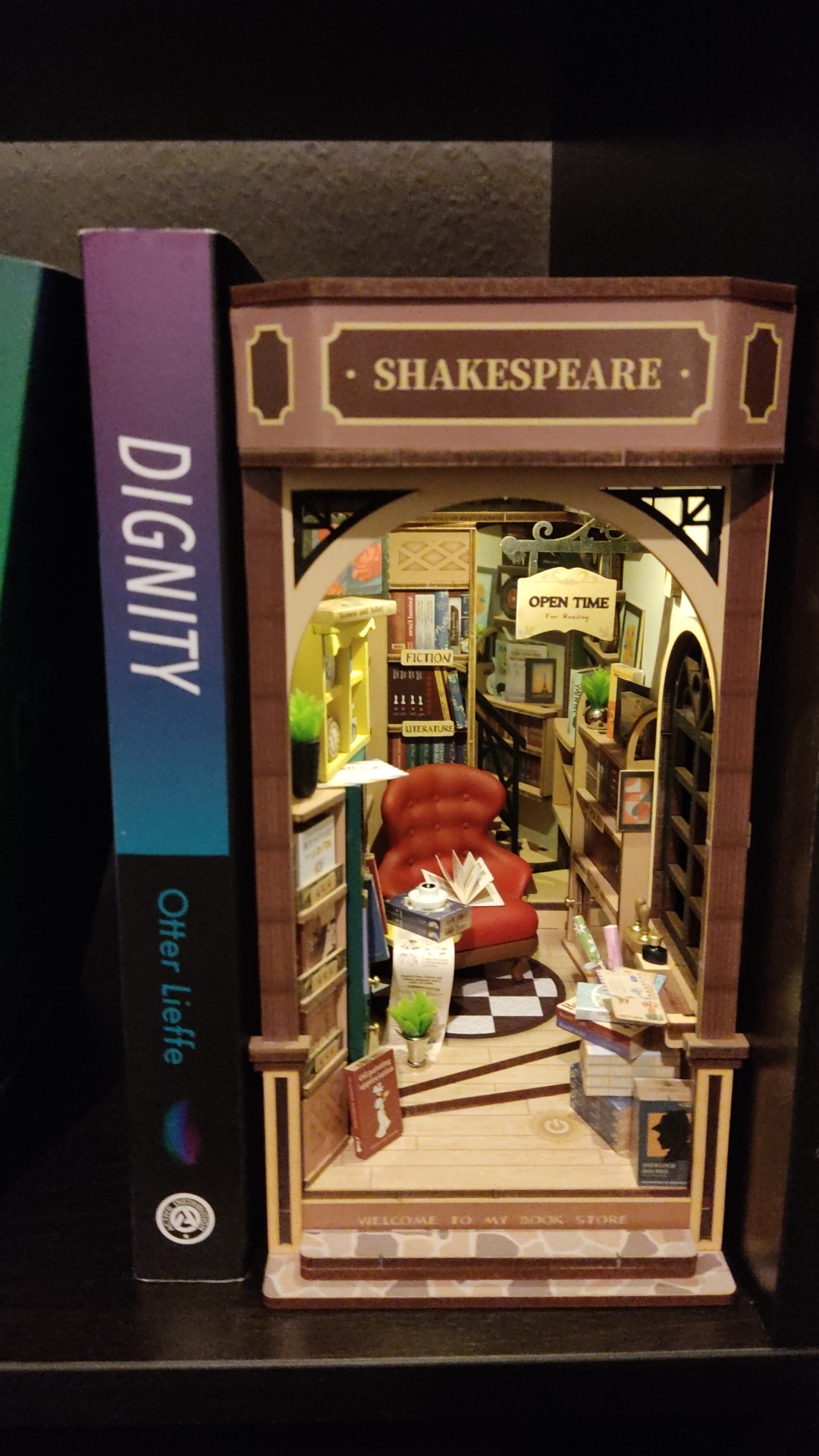
Book nook created from a commercially available kit

A book nook or a bookshelf insert is a miniature diorama designed to fit between books on a shelf. They often depict a form of a street or similar setting in a theme from famous books. Book nook can also make a form of a 3D model. They are similar to bookends but are placed in the middle of the books rather than on the ends.

The idea seems to have originated in 2018 from a Japanese artist called Monde.

The model is usually inspired by a theme from a famous book, e.g. Harry Potter (like popular Diagon Alley). People can buy book nooks fully assembled, or create them on their own.
