= Prindle, Patrick and Associates =

Former architectural firm

- Industry: Architecture
- Founded: Columbus, Ohio, U.S. (1957)
- Founder: Theodore Hord Prindle
- Headquarters: Columbus, Ohio, United States
- Area served: International
- Key people: Theodore Hord Prindle; Allen L. Patrick
- Services: Architecture, Urban Design, Urban planning

Prindle, Patrick and Associates was an architectural firm founded by architect Theodore Hord Prindle in 1957 as Titus & Prindle. The firm designed a wide range of buildings, but specialized in jails, prisons, and other correctional facilities. Its most notable projects include the Municipal Court, Hall of Justice, jail, and courthouse annex at the Franklin County Government Center in Columbus, Ohio, and the courthouse, jail, and county sheriff headquarters at the Justice Center Complex in Cleveland, Ohio. The firm dissolved in 1991.

== Firm history ==
After graduating from Ohio State University with a bachelor's degree in architecture, Prindle co-founded the architectural firm of Titus and Prindle in Columbus, Ohio, in 1957. After his partner left the firm in the early 1960s, the name of the firm was changed to Ted H. Prindle and Associates. The firm opened an office in Clearwater, Florida, in 1966. In December 1966, it won a contract to design the Franklin County, Ohio, jail in Columbus, and it built a bank branch in Zanesville, Ohio, in August 1967.

By 1969, Prindle had taken on Allen L. Patrick, a 1962 graduate of the University of Cincinnati, and the firm changed its name to Prindle & Patrick. Prindle moved to Clearwater in 1971, leaving Patrick to manage the Columbus office. Patrick increasingly specialized in correctional facilities, courthouses, and similar justice-related structures, and the firm designed such facilities in Ireland, Nigeria, and Turkey as well as the United States. The firm built a large number of justice-related structures in the 1960s, 1970s, and 1980s, becoming extremely well known for its corrections work even as it continued to design a wide range of other structures.

In the 1970s, Prindle & Patrick built a number of justice-related structures in Columbus, including the Franklin County Jail (1970), the 10-story Franklin County Hall of Justice (1973), the Franklin County Courthouse Annex (1975), the 19-story Franklin County Municipal Court (1979), and the Franklin County Parking Garage (1979). The Municipal Court won the firm a Bridge Prize for merit for its elevated pedestrian skywalk from the American Institute of Steel Construction. The firm also renovated the county jail in Hocking County, Ohio, in 1973. Prindle & Patrick designed the Sarasota County Jail in Sarasota County, Florida, in 1975. The county sued the firm in 1983 over a leaky roof, an exterior facade which broke off in sections, and poor plumbing. Prindle & Patrick countered that its design was not at fault; the contractor (which had since gone bankrupt) performed shoddy work, and Prindle & Patrick was not responsible for ensuring that the contractor did its job. In 1976, Patrick designed a new jail for the city of Lexington, Kentucky, which replaced two facilities built in the 1800s. That same year, the firm designed the massive Justice Center Complex in Cleveland, Ohio. This included the 26-story Courts Tower and the 10-story Corrections Center (which houses the Cuyahoga County Sheriff Department as well as the Cuyahoga County Jail).

The firm designed its first major hotel in 1980 when it was given the commission for the Hyatt Regency Columbus. The city of Columbus commissioned Prindle & Patrick and the planning firm of Edsall & Associates to prepare a redesign of Parsons Avenue, a major city thoroughfare. Their analysis, the "Parsons Avenue Urban Design Action Plan: Stage 1", was issued in 1981. In July 1981, Prindle, Patrick and Associates won a major contract to build a number of elementary school buildings in Holly Hill, Ormond Beach, and South Halifax, Florida. Serious problems emerged with three school designs in East Volusia, Florida, however. The roofs failed hurricane wind stress tests, and the heating and air conditioning systems often failed. The school board sued the Prindle, Patrick and Associates for mismanaging the projects—charges the firm promptly and strenuously denied. In 1981, the firm also designed a new West Pasco County Jail in New Port Richey, Florida. But the county sheriff refused to house inmates there when it opened in March 1982, arguing that the jail's design was unsafe for his jailers. Prindle declared the jail safe, saying it was designed to be staffed by 54 jailers and that the sheriff was trying to make do with just 19. In 1982, Prindle, Patrick and Associates completed work on the Pinellas County Criminal Court Building in Pinellas County, Florida. But the building leaked severely, and the contractor sued the architects for providing a substandard design and requiring inferior materials.

In 1982, the firm changed its name again to Prindle, Patrick and Associates (sometimes spelled Prindle, Patrick + Associates and occasionally referred to by the media as Prindle, Patrick & Partners).

Allen Patrick was elected to the College of Fellows of the American Institute of Architects in May 1987. Theodore Prindle retired in 1988, and the firm changed its name to Patrick & Associates. But the firm received fewer commissions after Prindle's retirement, and in 1991 Patrick dissolved the company and joined the architectural firm of Bohm-NBBJ.

=== Prindle, Patrick & Orput ===
A subsidiary architectural firm, Prindle, Patrick & Orput, was established in Illinois in the mid 1980s to solicit business in that state. The firm's most notable commission was the DuPage County Jail in DuPage County, Illinois, designed about 1983. The 150,000-square-foot (14,000 m^{2}), 354-bed prison immediately developed problems. Windows and skylights leaked, exterior bricks cracked, and the mortar between the bricks failed. The county decided against suing Prindle, Patrick & Orput, and sued the contractor for the cost of the $275,000 repairs.

== Bibliography ==
- American Consulting Engineers Council (1982). Membership Directory. Washington, D.C.: American Consulting Engineers Council.
- Darbee, Jeffrey T.; Recchie, Nancy A. (2008). The AIA Guide to Columbus. Ohio University Press. ISBN 9780821416846.
