= John Clague (artist) =

American sculptor (1928–2004)

John Clague (1928–2004) was an American artist and sculptor.

== Early life ==
Born in Cleveland, Ohio, Clague studied at the Cleveland Institute of Art, earning his Bachelor of Fine Arts in 1956 under Edris Eckhardt, Walter Sinz, Walter Midner, John Bergschneider, Julius Schmidt, and William McVey. He was awarded The Yale/Norfolk Fellowship and, after graduation, spent a year in Europe as a Catherwood Foundation Traveling Fellow. Clague taught sculpture at Oberlin College (1957–1961), and at the Cleveland Institute of Art (1956–1971), becoming chairman of the institute's sculpture department.

== Career ==
Clague's sculptures have been exhibited in the Whitney Museum of American Art, and in numerous "May Shows" at the Cleveland Museum of Art. He was awarded the Cleveland Arts Prize in 1967. He is represented in the permanent collections of the Cleveland Museum of Art by six of his sculptures, including his 1960 bronze "Flower of Erebus" and his 1963 plexiglas "Progression in Black and White". He also has exhibits in the Art Gallery of Ontario, the Aldrich Museum of Contemporary Art, the University of Massachusetts, and the Williams College Museum of Art. His work is documented in the Archives of American Art at the Smithsonian Institution in Washington, D.C.

Clague is best known for these large sculptures: abstract forms in bronze, steel, and fiberglass. He used light, color and high polish to alter surface texture creating patterns that change as one walks around. Some of his works also produce sound as they gently move.
