= Matsuricon =

Annual anime convention in Ohio

Coordinates: 39°58′17.83″N 83°0′1.94″W

- Status: Active
- Genre: Anime, manga, video games, and popular culture
- Venue: Hyatt Regency Columbus; Greater Columbus Convention Center
- Location: Columbus, Ohio
- Country: United States
- Inaugurated: 2006
- Attendance: 4,500 in 2014
- Website: http://www.matsuricon.org/

Matsuricon is a three-day anime convention held during August/September in Columbus, Ohio, at the Hyatt Regency Columbus and Greater Columbus Convention Center. The convention is family friendly.

== Programming ==
The convention typically offers an artist alley, cosplay contest, dealers room, formal ball, gaming (arcade, board, video), karaoke, masquerade, and a video contest. The Carolina Manga Library provided the conventions manga library in 2014. Matsuricon's 2014 charity fundraisers raised $13,916 and benefited Pelotonia.

== History ==
In 2012 the convention hosted the Distant Worlds concert, led by Arnie Roth. The concert was followed up with a meet and greet event with composer Nobuo Uematsu for VIP ticket holders. Matsuricon in 2018 shared convention center space with an Ohio GOP dinner that featured as a speaker President Donald Trump. Matsuricon 2020 and 2021 was cancelled and replaced by virtual events due to the COVID-19 pandemic.

=== Event history ===
| Dates | Location | Atten. | Guests |
|---|---|---|---|
| April 20–23, 2006 | Comfort Inn North; Columbus, Ohio | 400 | Johnny Yong Bosch, Joanna Estep, Eyeshine, Gakidomo, Michael Gould, Alex Kolesar, Joe Kovell, Christy Lijewski, Tristan MacAvery, William Sebree, Patrick Seitz, Mindy Timpone, Harlan Watkins, Mariah Watkins, and Where's the Buffet?. |
| September 7–9, 2007 | Columbus Marriott Northwest; Dublin, Ohio | 450 | Alex Kolesar, Joe Kovell, Tristan MacAvery, So Be It, Harlan Watkins, Mariah Watkins, and Where's the Buffet?. |
| August 22–24, 2008 | Holiday Inn Columbus-Worthington; Worthington, Ohio | 702 | Robert Axelrod, Alex Kolesar, Joe Kovell, Tristan MacAvery, Jeremy Mauney, Mindy Timpone, Harlan Watkins, Mariah Watkins, and E. K. Weaver. |
| August 28–30, 2009 | Holiday Inn Columbus-Worthington; Worthington, Ohio | 850 | Jamal Ard, Robert Axelrod, Juliet Cesario, Trevor Devall, Caitlin Glass, Kyle Hebert, Steve Horton, Chris Hoskins, Brandon Johnson, Alex Kolesar, Joe Kovell, Tristan MacAvery, Chris Martin, Kevin McKeever, Tyler Patrick, Mindy Timpone, Xenogenesis, and Stephanie Young. |
| August 13–15, 2010 | Doubletree Hotel Columbus/Worthington; Columbus, Ohio | 1,550 | Jamal Ard, David Brehm, Scott Freeman, Hilary Hatch, Kyle Hebert, Chris Hoskins, Brandon Johnson, Alex Kolesar, Joe Kovell, Kevin McKeever, Jacob Newell, Brina Palencia, Michael Poe, Micah Solusod, Sonny Strait, Mindy Timpone, Eric Vale, Doug Walker, Julie Wright, and Stephanie Young. |
| August 17–19, 2011 | Hyatt Regency Columbus; Columbus, Ohio | 2,700 | Kevin Bolk, David Brehm, Scott Freeman, Jessie James Grelle, Jennifer Hale, Clarine Harp, James Hatton, Kyle Hebert, Taliesin Jaffe, Alex Kolesar, Joe Kovell, Cherami Leigh, Kevin McKeever, Steve "Warky" Nunez, Brina Palencia, Ian Sinclair, Micah Solusod, Sonny Strait, Eric Stuart, Veronica Taylor, Mindy Timpone, Alexis Tipton, Eric Vale, Doug Walker, and Stephanie Young. |
| August 24–26, 2012 | Hyatt Regency Columbus; Columbus, Ohio | 3,000 | Madison Bartholemew, David Brehm, Chris Cason, Samurai Dan Coglan, Scott Freeman, Todd Haberkorn, James Hatton, Alex Kolesar, Joe Kovell, Cherami Leigh, Kevin McKeever, Scott McNeil, Tony Oliver, Brina Palencia, Christopher Sabat, Ian Sinclair, Micah Solusod, Sonny Strait, Mindy Timpone, Nobuo Uematsu, Doug Walker, Cathy Weseluck, Stephanie Young, and Apphia Yu (Ayu Sakata). |
| August 23–25, 2013 | Hyatt Regency Columbus; Columbus, Ohio | 4,400 | Scott Freeman, James Hatton, Kyle Hebert, Chuck Huber, Alex Kolesar, Joe Kovel, Lauren Landa, Scott McNeil, Ian Sinclair, Micah Solusod, John Swasey, J. Michael Tatum, David Vincent, Lisle Wilkerson, Travis Willingham, Stephanie Young, and Apphia Yu (Ayu Sakata). |
| August 22–24, 2014 | Hyatt Regency Columbus; Columbus, Ohio | 4,500 | Kevin Bolk, Johnny Yong Bosch, David Brehm, Christine Marie Cabanos, Jillian Coglan, Samurai Dan Coglan, Eyeshine, Scott Freeman, Jessie James Grelle, Darrel Guilbeau, James Hatton, Chuck Huber, Erik Scott Kimerer, Lauren Landa, Scott McNeil, Danielle McRae, Erica Mendez, Matthew Mercer, Trina Nishimura, Professor Shyguy, Ian Sinclair, Micah Solusod, Brad Swaile, Symphonic Anime Orchestra, Sarah Anne Williams, Stephanie Young, and Apphia Yu (Ayu Sakata). |
| August 14–16, 2015 | Hyatt Regency Columbus; Greater Columbus Convention Center; Crowne Plaza; Columbus, Ohio | 5,500 | Kevin Bolk, David Brehm, Jessica Calvello, Jillian Coglan, Samurai Dan Coglan, Kyle Hebert, Bridget Hoffman, Alex Kolesar, Joe Kovell, Lauren Landa, Cherami Leigh, Scott McNeil, Erica Mendez, Matthew Mercer, Tony Oliver, Jake Paque, Professor Shyguy, Patrick Seitz, Ciarán Strange, Karen Strassman, John Swasey, Eric Vale, Cristina Vee, Lisle Wilkerson, and Stephanie Young. |
| August 19–21, 2016 | Hyatt Regency Columbus; Columbus, Ohio | 5,300 | Kevin Bolk, Colleen Clinkenbeard, Jillian Coglan, Samurai Dan Coglan, Richard Epcar, Lydia Mackay, Mike McFarland, Lisa Ortiz, Brina Palencia, Professor Shyguy, Christopher Sabat, Tara Sands, Patrick Seitz, Ian Sinclair, Michael Sinterniklaas, Paul St. Peter, Sonny Strait, Ciarán Strange, John Swasey, and Eric Vale. |
| August 25–27, 2017 | Hyatt Regency Columbus; Columbus, Ohio | 5,700 | Zach Aguilar, Christine Marie Cabanos, Jennifer Cihi, Robbie Daymond, Sandy Fox, Erika Harlacher, Kyle Hebert, Xanthe Huynh, Kazha, Lauren Landa, Lex Lang, Erica Lindbeck, Julie Maddalena, Kyle McCarley, Erica Mendez, Tony Oliver, and Spike Spencer. |
| August 24-26, 2018 | Hyatt Regency Columbus; Greater Columbus Convention Center; Columbus, Ohio | 6,500 | Ray Chase, Jillian Coglan, Samurai Dan Coglan, Ben Diskin, Todd Haberkorn, Erika Harlacher, Caleb Hyles, Mela Lee, Cherami Leigh, Erica Lindbeck, Kyle McCarley, Tony Oliver, Bryce Papenbrook, Jamieson Price, Professor Shyguy, Kaiji Tang, TeddyLoid, and Kari Wahlgren. |
| August 16-18, 2019 | Hyatt Regency Columbus; Greater Columbus Convention Center; Columbus, Ohio | | Kevin Bolk, Justin Briner, Ray Chase, Luci Christian, Robbie Daymond, Quinton Flynn, Caitlin Glass, Jessie James Grelle, Joel McDonald, Brandon McInnis, Erica Mendez, Jez Roth, Ian Sinclair, John Swasey, J. Michael Tatum, Toshifumi Yoshida, and Ryan Zanfei |
| August 12-14, 2022 | Hyatt Regency Columbus; Greater Columbus Convention Center; Columbus, Ohio | | Kevin Bolk, Griffin Burns, Aaron Dismuke, Katelyn Gault, Kyle Hebert, Caleb Hyles, Jerry Jewell, Emi Lo, Kyle McCarley, Joel McDonald, Brandon McInnis, Professor Shyguy, and Ciarán Strange. |
| August 11-13, 2023 | Hyatt Regency Columbus; Greater Columbus Convention Center; Columbus, Ohio | | Kevin Bolk, Ricco Fajardo, Bridget Hoffman, Natalie Rose Hoover, Caleb Hyles, Brittany Lauda, Erica Lindbeck, Brandon McInnis, Nano, Tony Oliver, J. Michael Tatum, Chris Tergliafera, Kirk Thornton, Kaoru Wada, and Jonathan Young. |
| August 30 - September 1, 2024 | Hyatt Regency Columbus; Greater Columbus Convention Center; Columbus, Ohio | | Bryson Baugus, Kevin Bolk, Kamen Casey, SungWon Cho, Jordan Dash Cruz, Ricco Fajardo, Dorah Fine, Katelyn Gault, Caitlin Glass, Chris Hackney, Kyle McCarley, Brandon McInnis, Lexi Nieto, Tony Oliver, Jamieson Price, Michael Sinterniklaas, J. Michael Tatum, David Vincent, and Toshifumi Yoshida. |
| August 29-31, 2025 | Hyatt Regency Columbus; Greater Columbus Convention Center; Columbus, Ohio | | Dawn M. Bennett, Kevin Bolk, Edward Bosco, Clifford Chapin, Ray Chase, Jordan Dash Cruz, Robbie Daymond, Ricco Fajardo, Jill Harris, Caleb Hyles, Erica Lindbeck, Jamie Marchi, Adam McArthur, Mary Elizabeth McGlynn, Kristen McGuire, Brandon McInnis, Risa Mei, Max Mittelman, Dallas Reid, Mallorie Rodak, Keith Silverstein, J. Michael Tatum, Briana White, Anne Yatco, and Jonathan Young. |
| September 4-6, 2026 | Greater Columbus Convention Center; Columbus, Ohio | | Bryson Baugus, Kevin Bolk, Kira Buckland, Katie Caruso, SungWon Cho, Amber Lee Connors, Melissa Fahn, Ricco Fajardo, Christina Marie Kelly, Brittany Lauda, Cherami Leigh, Mona Marshall, Daman Mills, Casey Mongillo, Tony Oliver, Griffin Puatu, Dallas Reid, Joshua Seth, Matt Shipman, David Sobolov, Corey Wilder, and Cedric Williams. |
