= H. Edward Winter =

- Born: October 14, 1908
- Died: July 22, 1976 (aged 67)
- Known for: Enamelist

Harold Edward Winter (October 14, 1908 – July 22, 1976) was an American artist who worked primarily in enamels. Known also as H. Edward Winter and Edward Winter, he wrote several books on enameling and produced enamel murals for churches and the Section of Painting and Sculpture.

== Biography ==
Harold Edward Winter was born in Pasadena, California, to John Edward Winter and Lila (Deveny) Winter. He studied art in Vienna, and went on to teach at the Cleveland Institute of Art (1935–37) and Old White Art Colony in West Virginia.

In December 1939, he married the ceramist Thelma Frazier. Winter died in 1976, and his wife died the following year.

== Work ==
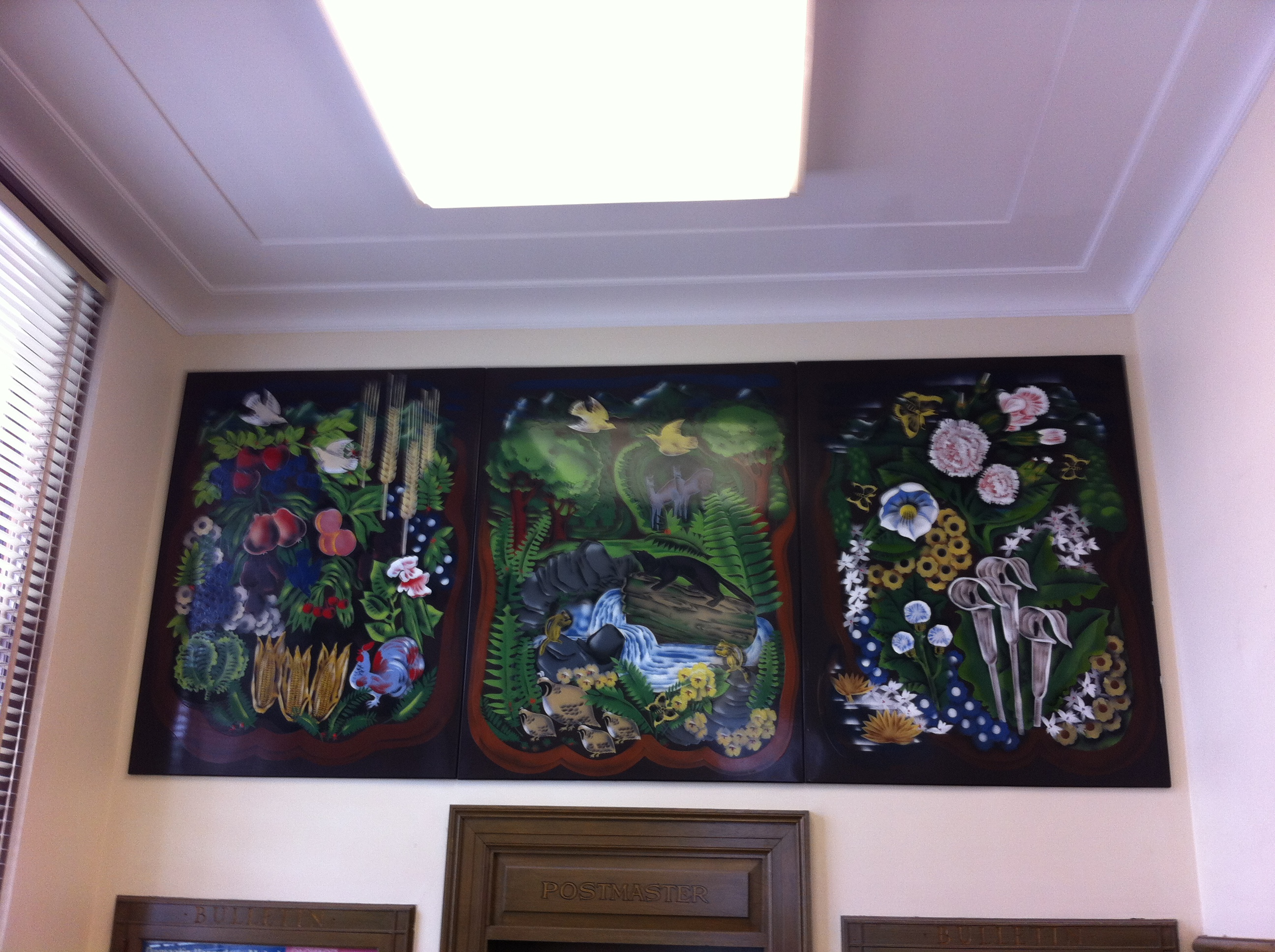
Flora and Fauna of the Region (1941), Edward Winter's enamel mural at the post office in Cassville, Missouri

Winter created abstract compositions with occasional botanical or biomorphic elements. He employed copper, steel, silver, or aluminum as his substrate and sometimes used foil inlays in addition to the enamel colors. The works ranged from household tableware to large wall plaques. In the 1950s, Thelma started working in enamel as well, and the pair worked both independently and collaboratively on various projects. They created a number of sizable enamel murals, including eleven commissioned by churches. Winter wrote Enamel Art on Metals (1958), Enameling for Beginners (1962), and Enamel Painting Techniques (1970), as well as many articles on his medium. The first of these was praised as an important book from a master of the craft when it first appeared.

During World War II, while serving as a technical sergeant, Winter received a special commission from the U.S. Army to make educational posters.

In the 1960s, Winter offered a kit for making enameled aluminum jewelry.

His work is in the Cleveland Museum of Art, the Butler Museum of Art, and other institutions.
