= Arthur Eugene Baggs =

American potter and chemist (1886–1947)

Arthur Eugene Baggs (27 October 1886, New York City – 15 February 1947, Columbus) was an American chemist and potter.

He studied under Charles Fergus Binns at Alfred University. In 1904-05 he established Marblehead Pottery in Marblehead, Massachusetts, and designed vessels there until it closed in 1936. Meanwhile, he worked as a glaze chemist at Cowan Pottery from 1925 to 1928. From 1928 on he taught ceramics at Ohio State University.

Baggs' work is characterized by simple forms and muted, earthen colors. He is especially noted for his salt-glaze stoneware.
