= Hyatt Regency Columbus =

High-rise hotel in Columbus, Ohio

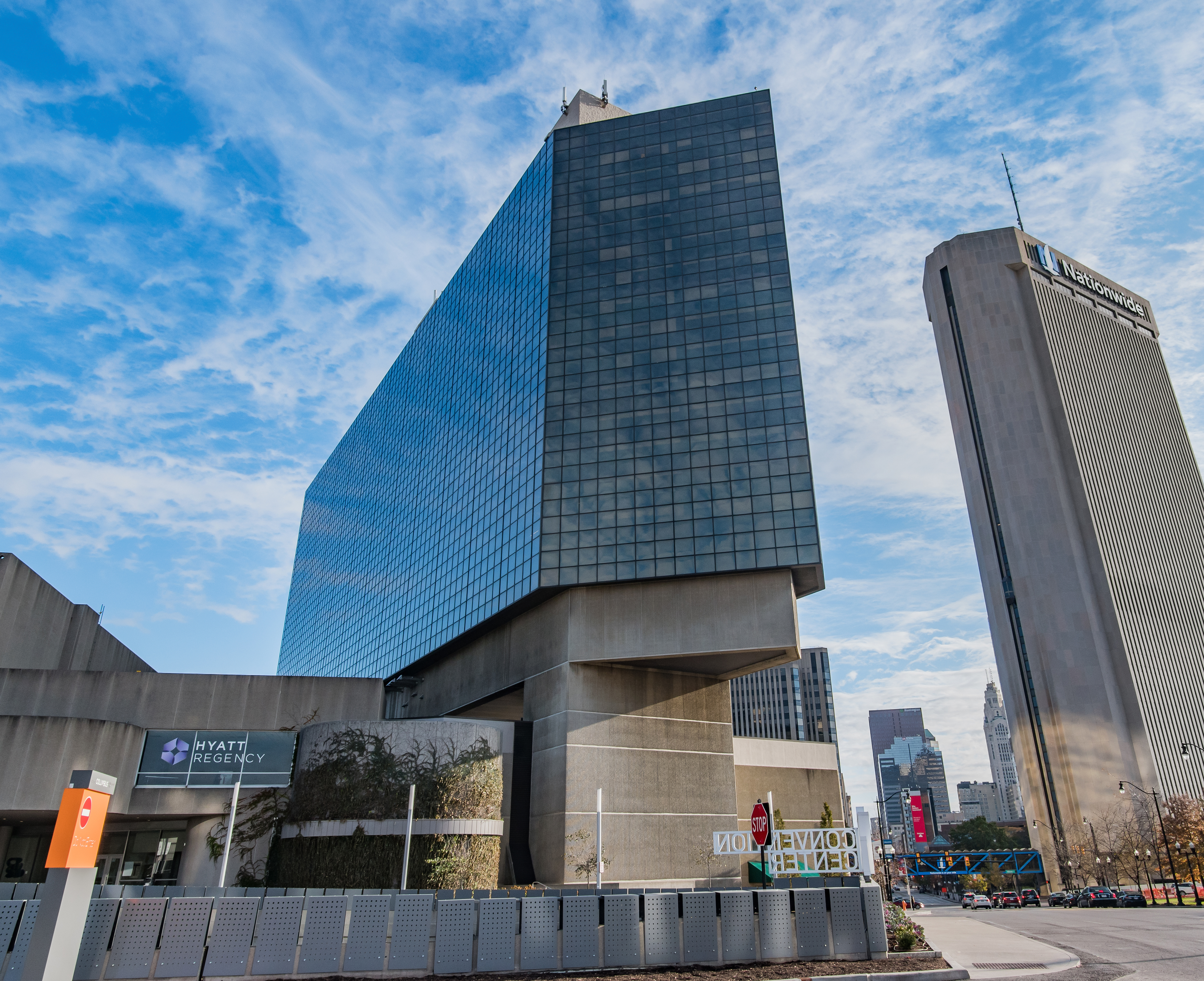
- Interactive map of the Hyatt Regency Columbus area

General information
- Type: Hotel
- Location: 350 North High Street, Columbus, Ohio, United States
- Coordinates: 39.96967°N 83.00114°W
- Construction started: 1979
- Completed: 1980
- Opening: October 26, 1980
- Owner: Global Hyatt Corporation

Height
- Roof: 256 ft (78 m)

Technical details
- Floor count: 20

Design and construction
- Architect: Prindle, Patrick + Associates
- Developer: The Galbreath Company

The Hyatt Regency Columbus is a 20-story 256-foot (78 m) high-rise hotel in Columbus, Ohio, United States. It is the 24th-tallest building in the city and was designed by Prindle, Patrick + Associates along with the adjoining Ohio Center, which opened first, on September 10, 1980, with the hotel following on October 26, 1980 and the Greater Columbus Convention Center which opnened in 1993. The four-star hotel has 615 rooms and 16 suites, as well as a grand ballroom and 32 conference rooms.

== See also ==
- List of tallest buildings in Columbus, Ohio
