= Sid Ramnarace =

Canadian automobile designer

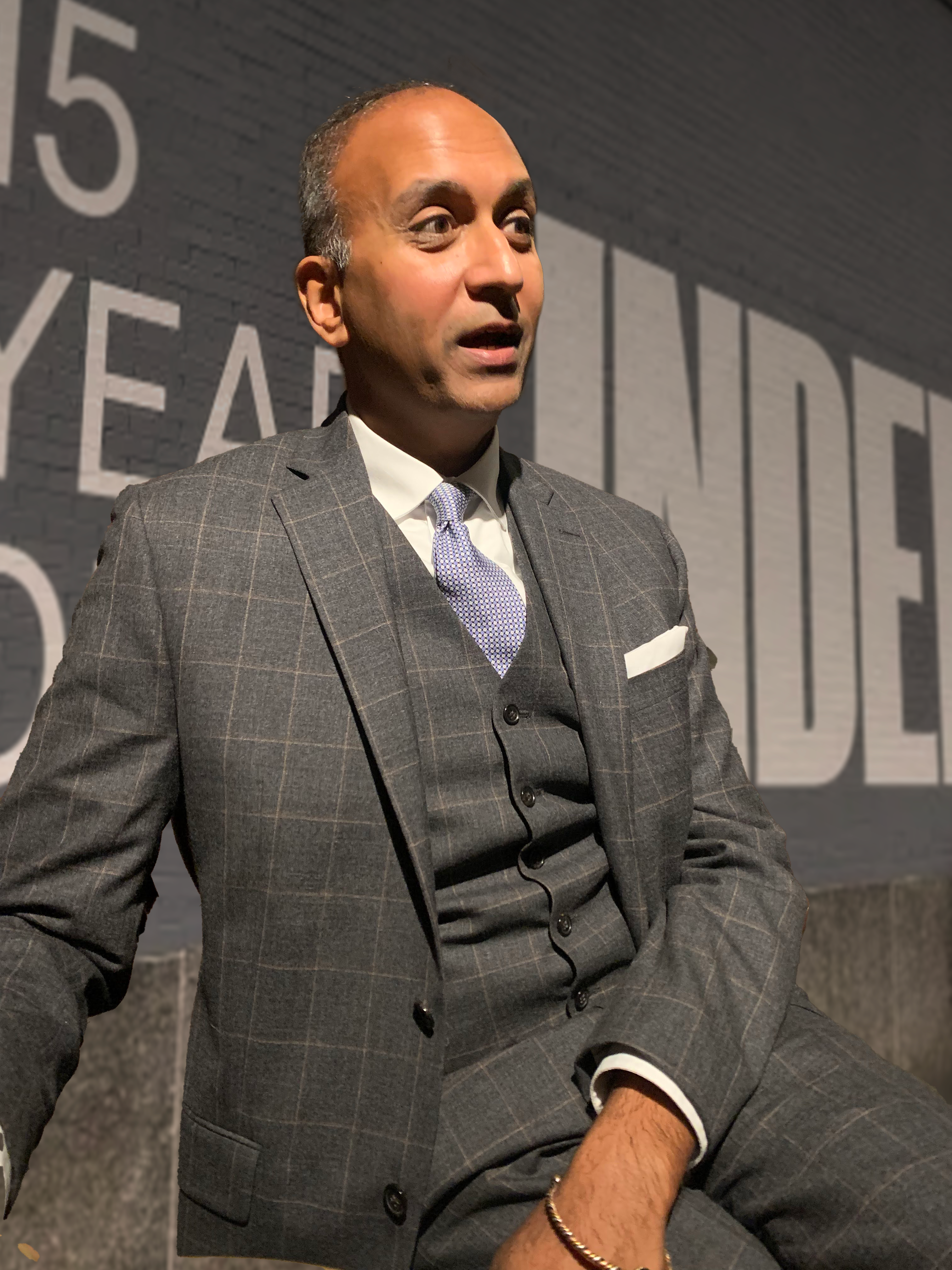
- Ramnarace at the 2024 Independent Art Fair opening reception at Spring Studios in New York City
- Education: Cleveland Institute of Art
- Occupation: Industrial Designer • Consumer Strategist
- Known for: Ford Mustang; Cuisinart; Aston Martin Project Vantage Concept; Ford 24.7; Savora; Videri

Sid Ramnarace is a Canadian-born American designer, and consumer strategist who has worked with the Ford Motor Company, in Dearborn, Michigan, United States, and has designed automobiles, furniture, jewelry, textiles, glassware, and home decor.

== Background ==
At the age of 12, he submitted letters to Chuck Jordan at General Motors and Jack Telnack at Ford in the hope of receiving advice on landing a job as an automobile designer. Based on the reply from those letters, Ramnarace subsequently enrolled at the prestigious Brooklyn Technical High School, majoring in Industrial Design. He went on to study at the Cleveland Institute of Art, where he graduated with a degree in industrial design, studying under design pioneer, Viktor Schreckengost.

== Career ==
=== Automotive and Transportation ===
After a brief stint at General Motors as a contract designer, Ramnarace began at Ford working at Ford's Global Design Center and developed textiles, color and trim for the Ford Explorer, Ford Prodigy and 24.7 show car concepts, where he worked under VP of Design J Mays and Chief Designer Laurens van den Acker.

He has contributed to automobile interiors and exteriors including the Ford Edge and Lincoln MKX, Ford Flex, Ford Thunderbird and most notably, the 5th generation Ford Mustang which was cited as one of the most iconic cars of the last 20 years.

=== IoT and Media Technology ===
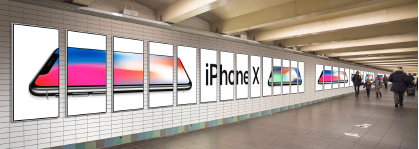
New York City Metropolitan Transit Installation at Grand Central–42nd Street station Subway Station in 2019

In 2019, Ramnarace became EVP at Videri, an early-stage IoT and media technology firm, responsible for the development and implementation of addressable displays, cloud distribution, engaging content capabilities, and a unique app-enabled infrastructure. Through a partnership with the New York Transit Authority and Outfront Media, the firm implemented a strategic deployment of its ON Smart Media platform, throughout the New York City Subway system and subsequently to stadiums retail environments and public spaces around the world.

=== Consumer Goods ===
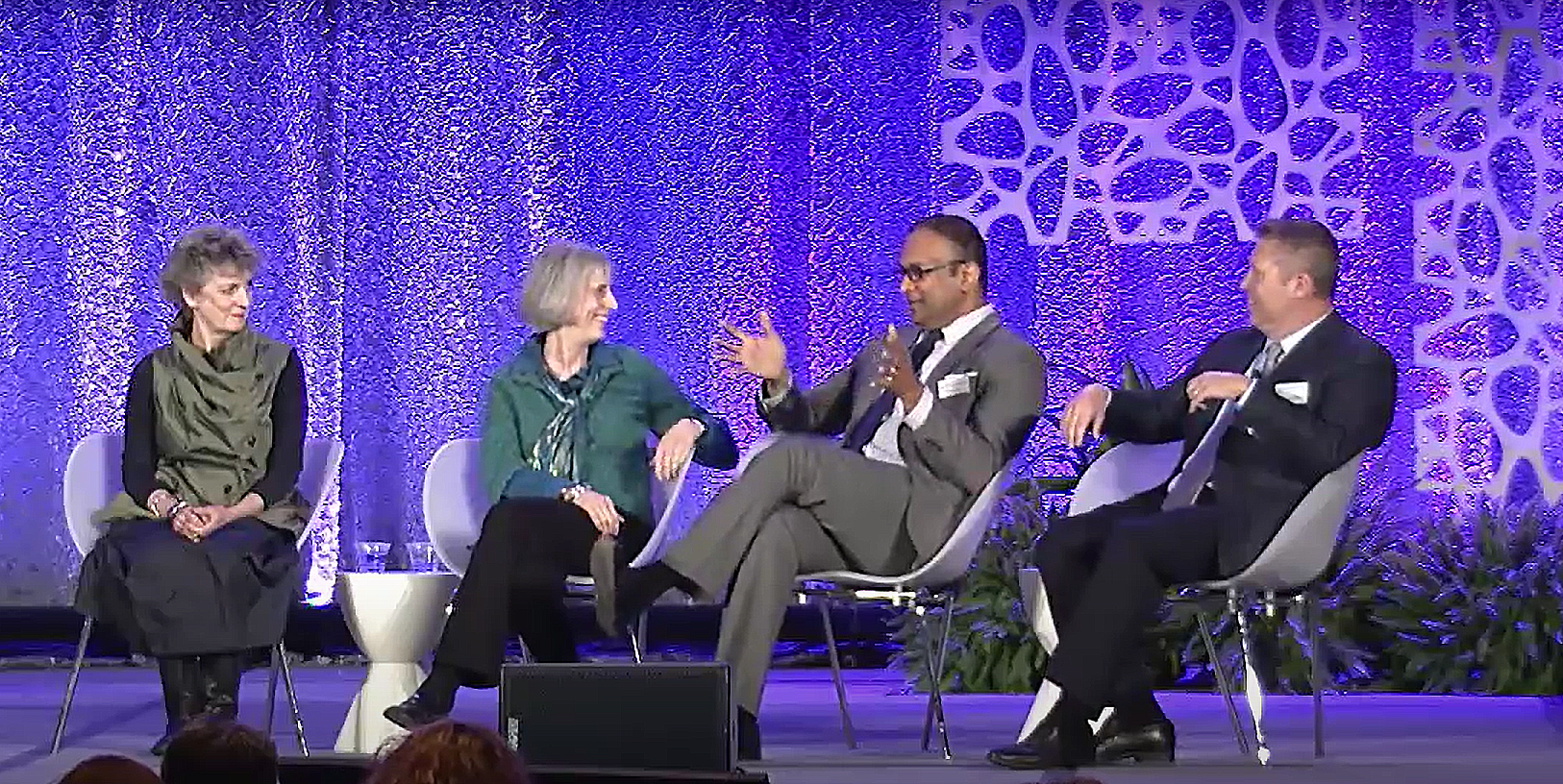
International Housewares Association Trade Panel 2015

In 2021, following the acquisition of Conair Corporation by the New York-based private equity firm, American Securities, Ramnarace joined to lead a brand and product revitalization for Cuisinart.

Partnering with international product development and innovation firms, Harman, Karim Rashid, Inc. alumnus, Steve Cozzolino, Ramnarace launched the One Cuisinart Strategy to promote the brand globally. Ramnarace worked extensively with members of the CMA in Asia to promote trade, focusing on emerging technologies and manufacturing expertise.

In 2022, Ramnarace led an effort with the executive team from American Securities to engage Berlin-based MetaDesign, part of the Publicis Groupe in a strategic redesign of the Cuisinart brand experience. Subsequently, agency partners Publicis Sapient were brought in to manage a comprehensive redesign of the brand e-commerce and web experience based on the work done by Ramnarace and MetaDesign.

Ramnarace has also spent time teaching at his alma mater as well as appearing as a guest speaker at the University of Michigan Ross School of Business at the MBA in Marketing program.

== Selected projects ==
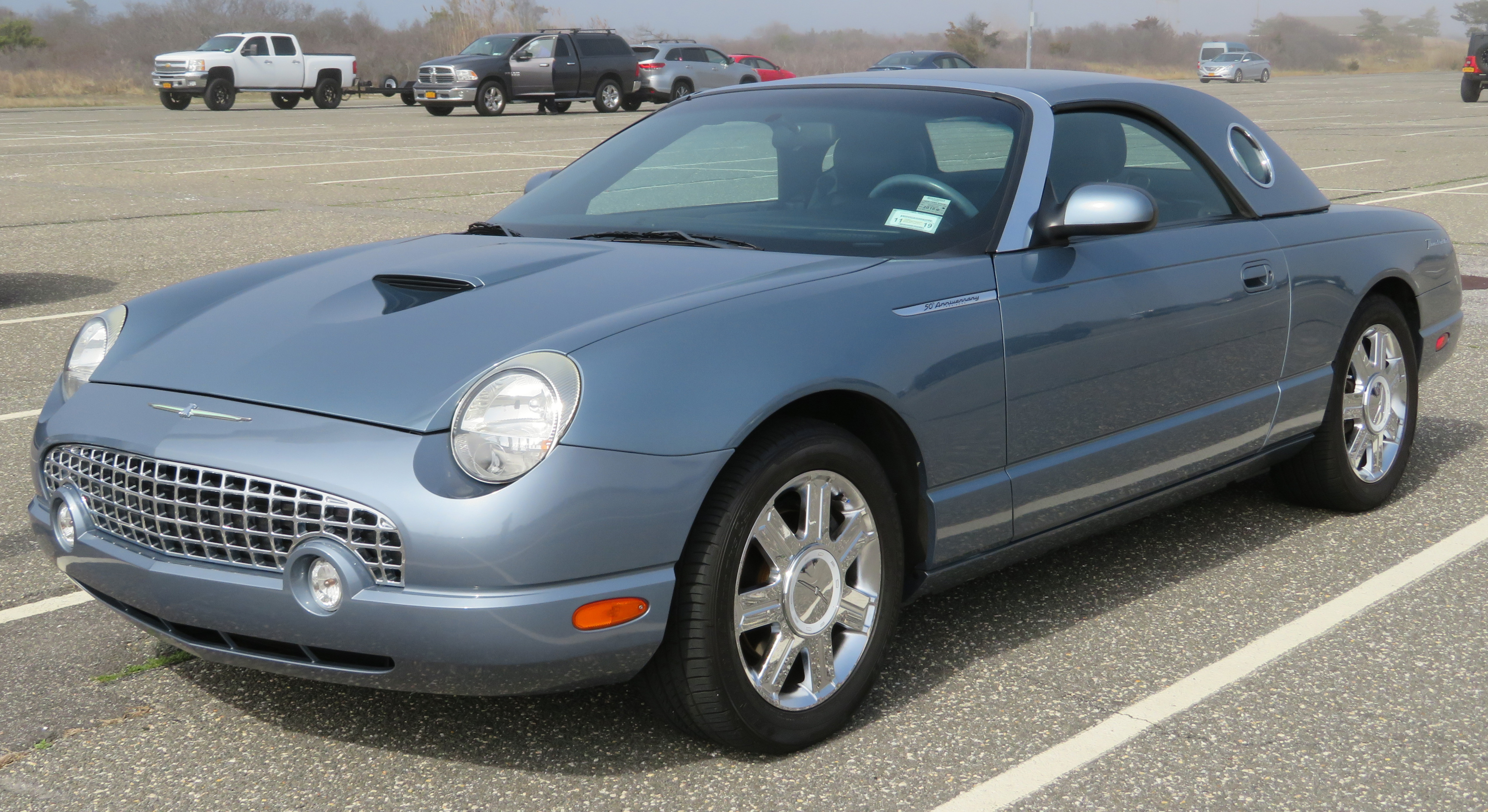
Ford Thunderbird (11th Generation)

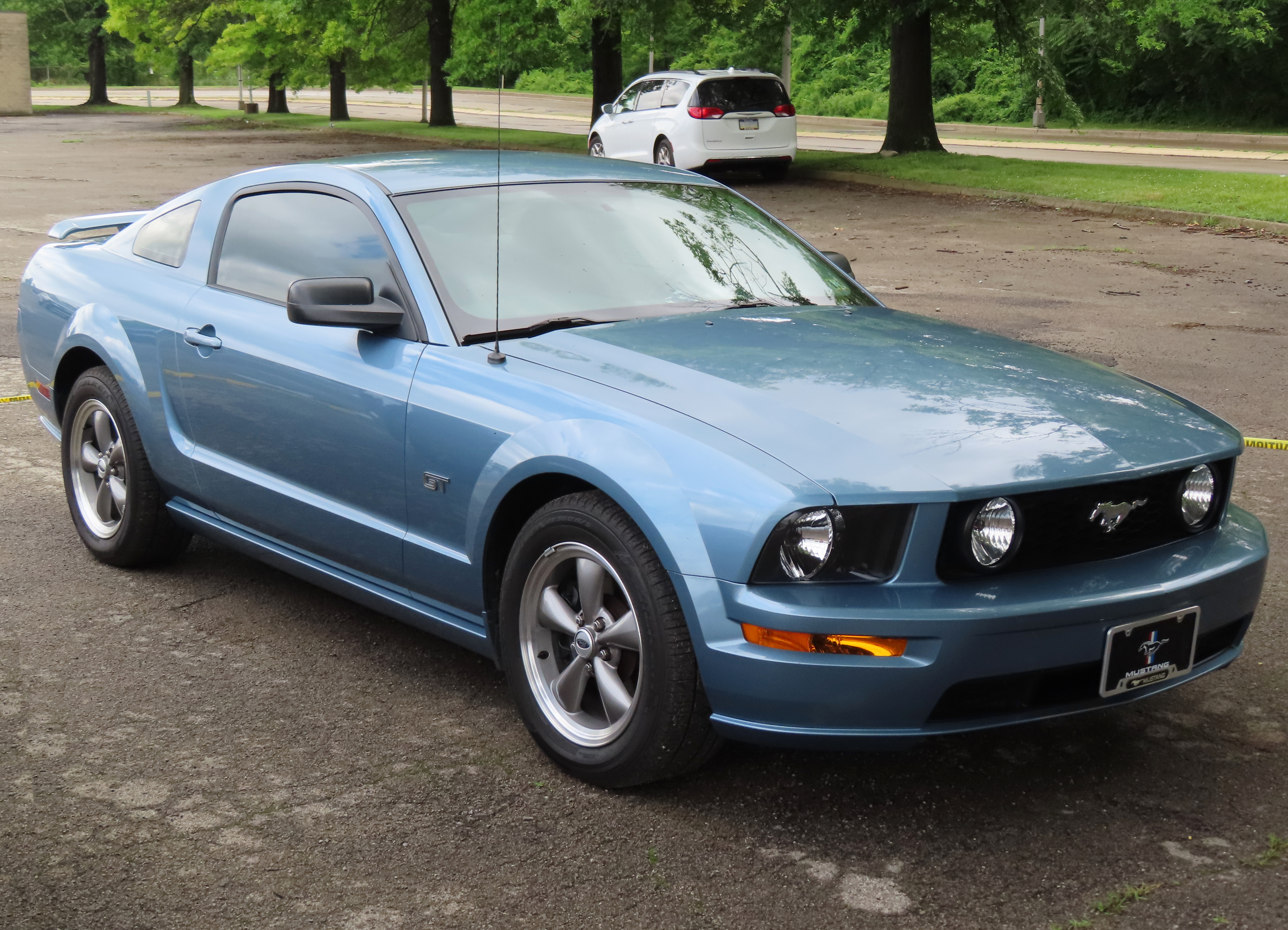
Ford Mustang (5th Generation)

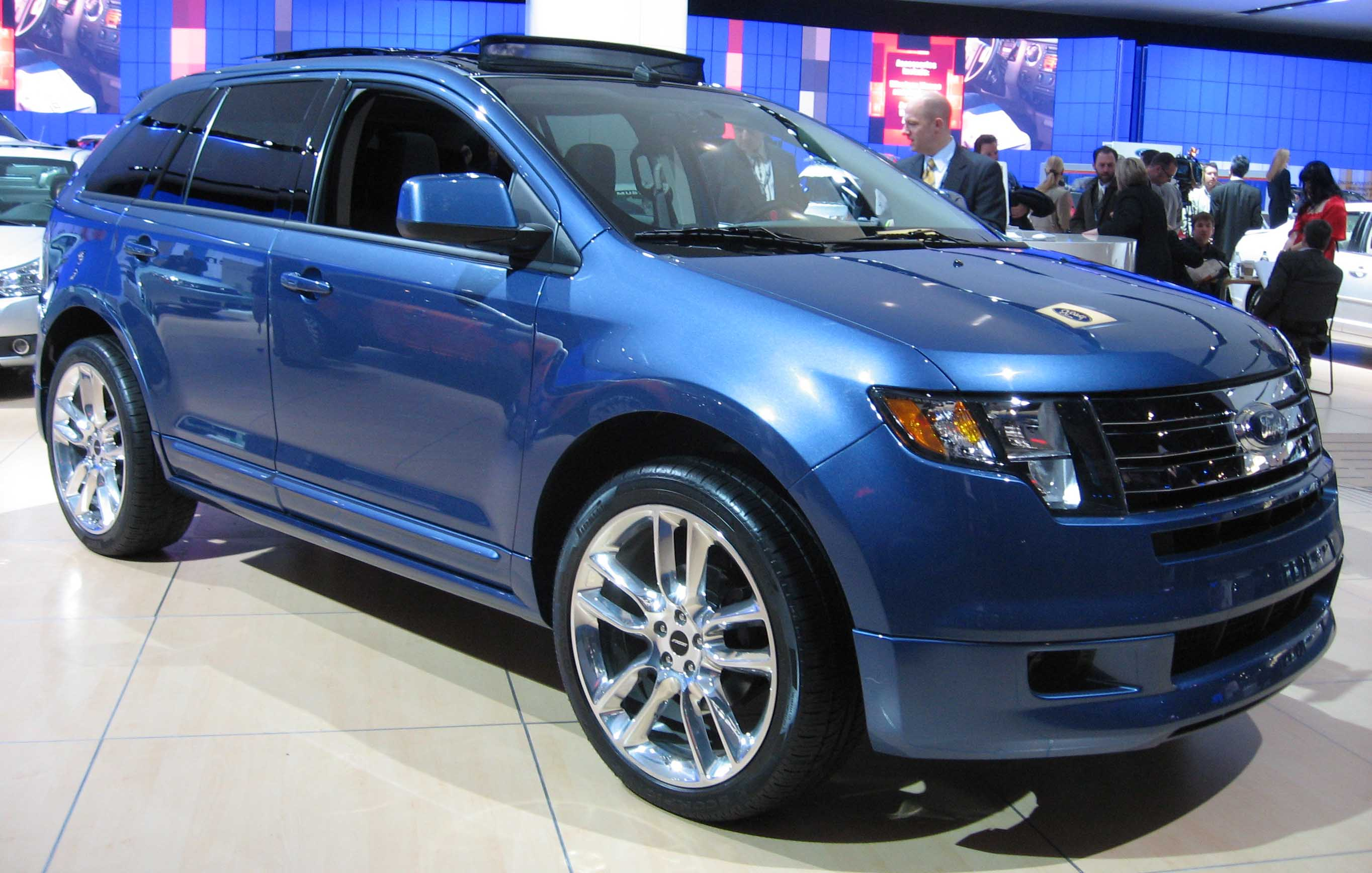
Ford Edge

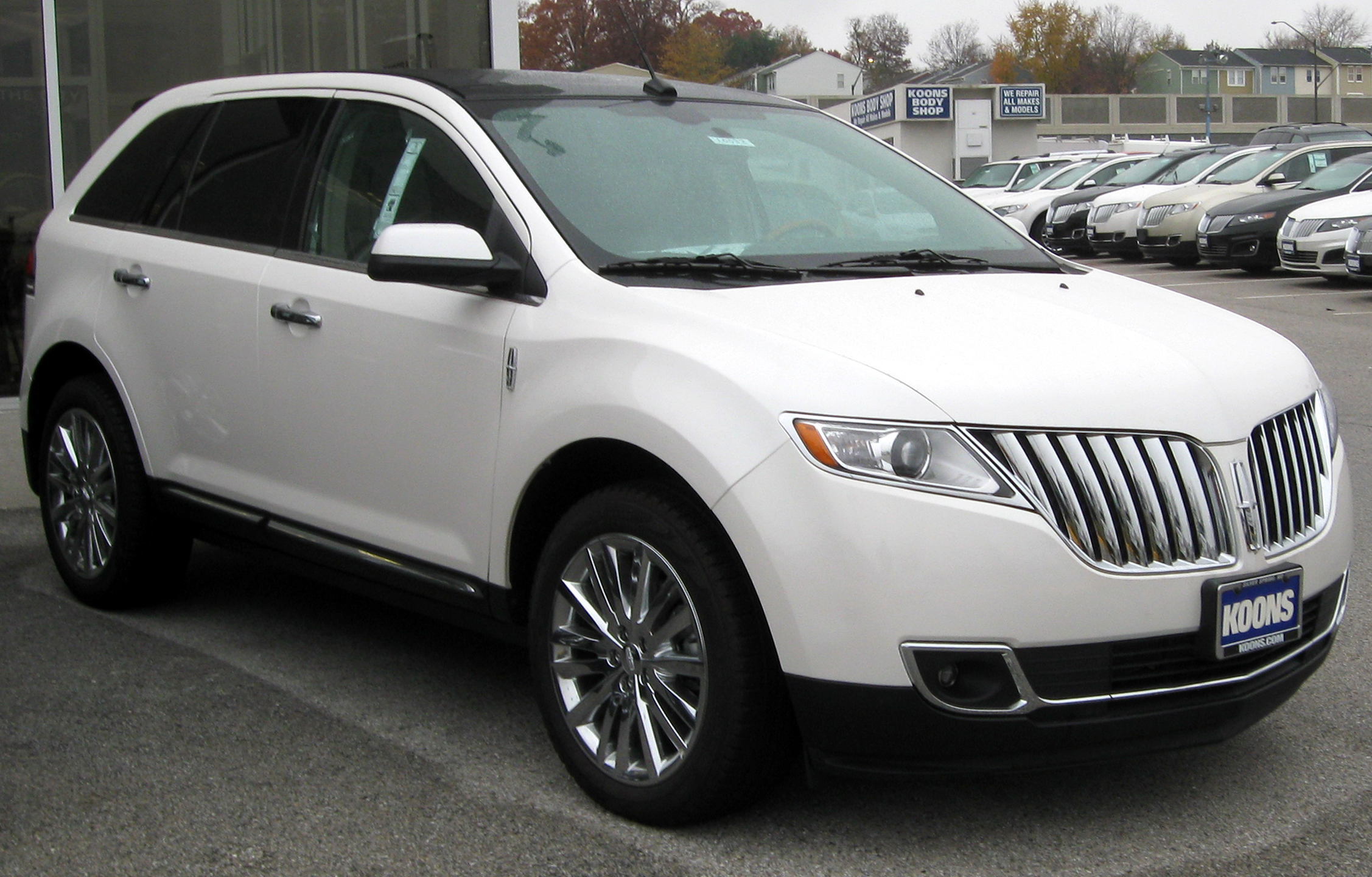
Lincoln MKX

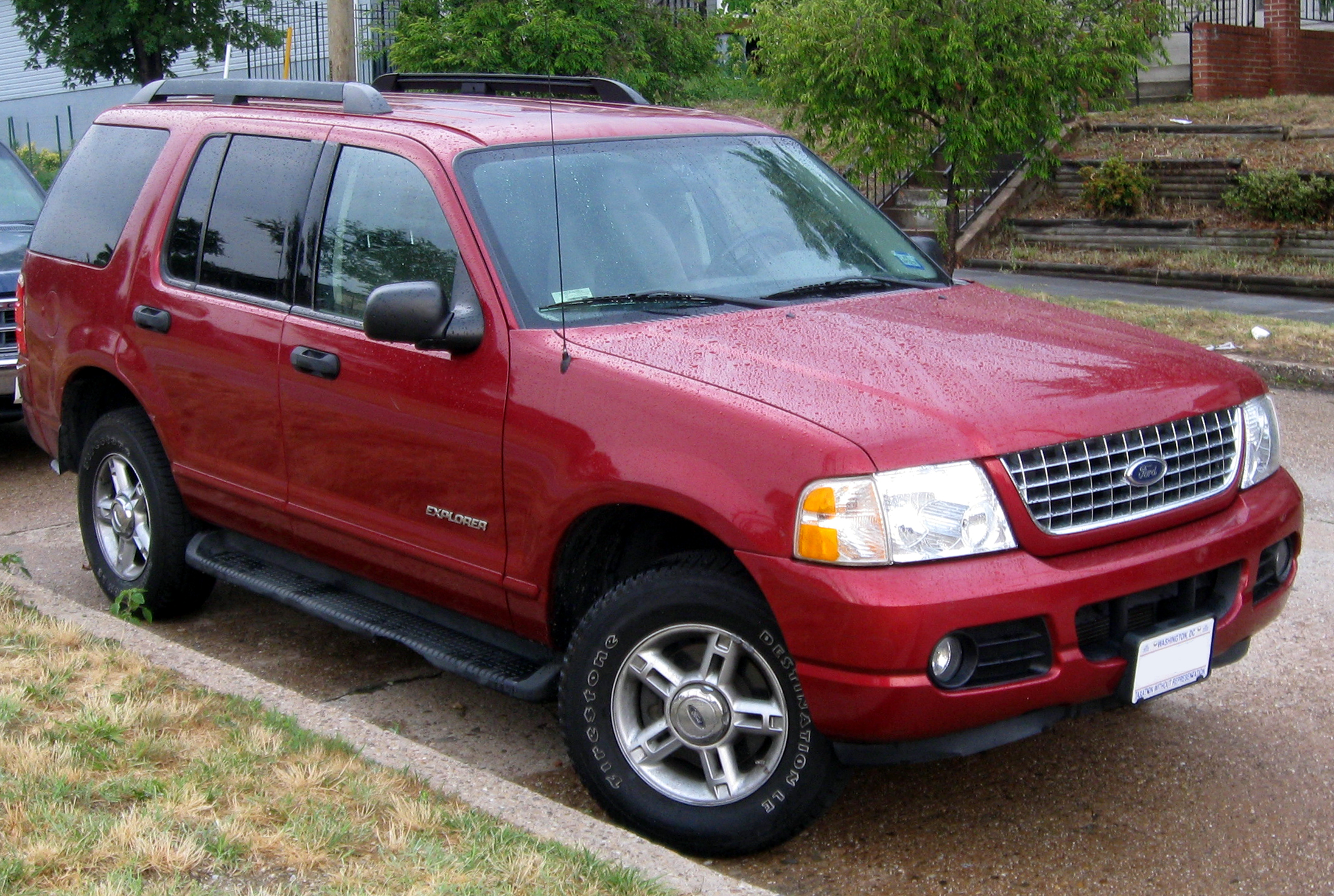
Ford Explorer (3rd Generation)

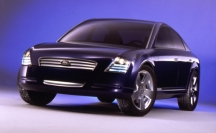
Ford Prodigy Concept
