= Bookends (software) =

Commercial reference management software package for macOS

- Developer(s): Sonny Software
- Stable release: 15.1.2 / 8 March 2025
- Operating system: macOS, iOS, iPadOS
- Type: Reference management
- License: Proprietary
- Website: Official website

Bookends is a commercial reference management software package for macOS that is used to manage bibliographies and references when writing essays and articles. Its target market is students, academics and professionals. It works with several word processors, including Microsoft Word, Apple Pages, Mellel, Nisus Writer Express, OpenOffice.org Writer, Scrivener (software) and others. Bookends is made by Sonny Software and maintained by its owner and developer Jon Ashwell. It is in active development

Bookends is able to carry out Internet searches in a number of websites such as PubMed and Google Scholar in order to retrieve references and corresponding PDF files or web pages, or to obtain references for articles in PDF format which were already retrieved. These search capabilities are also present in Reference Miner, a freeware scaled-down version of Bookends which lacks bibliographic management features.

There also exists a version of Apple's iOS that can either be used as a stand-alone reference manager or synchronized with the desktop version.

== See also ==
- Comparison of reference management software
