= BookEnds =

American non-profit organization

- Formation: 1998
- Founder: Robin and Brandon Keefe
- Type: non-profit organization

BookEnds is a non-profit organization founded in 1998 in Southern California that helps children collect books and donate them to other children in areas of low literacy.

== History ==
It was founded in 1998 by the mother-and-son team of Robin and Brandon Keefe in Agoura Hills. Brandon, then eight years old and in the third grade, led his school class in a book drive to build a library at a local home for abused children.

BookEnds became a non-profit organization in 2002, and Robin Keefe serves as its president. It "recycles children's books" through student-led book drives and donates them to schools and youth organizations that need them. In addition to its regular book drives, it holds an annual Scrabble challenge. The organization claims to have donated more than 2 million books to 500,000 children.

As of April 2024, there is no online reference to BookEnds dated after 2014, suggesting that it may now be defunct - or have been merged with another body or changed its name.

== Recognition ==
BookEnds received Freeman, Freeman & Smiley Foundation Visions in Philanthropy Award in 2000 and the President's Volunteer Service Award from President George Bush in 2004. Brandon and BookEnds were featured in the 2006 book Passionaries.
