= Bookend terrace =

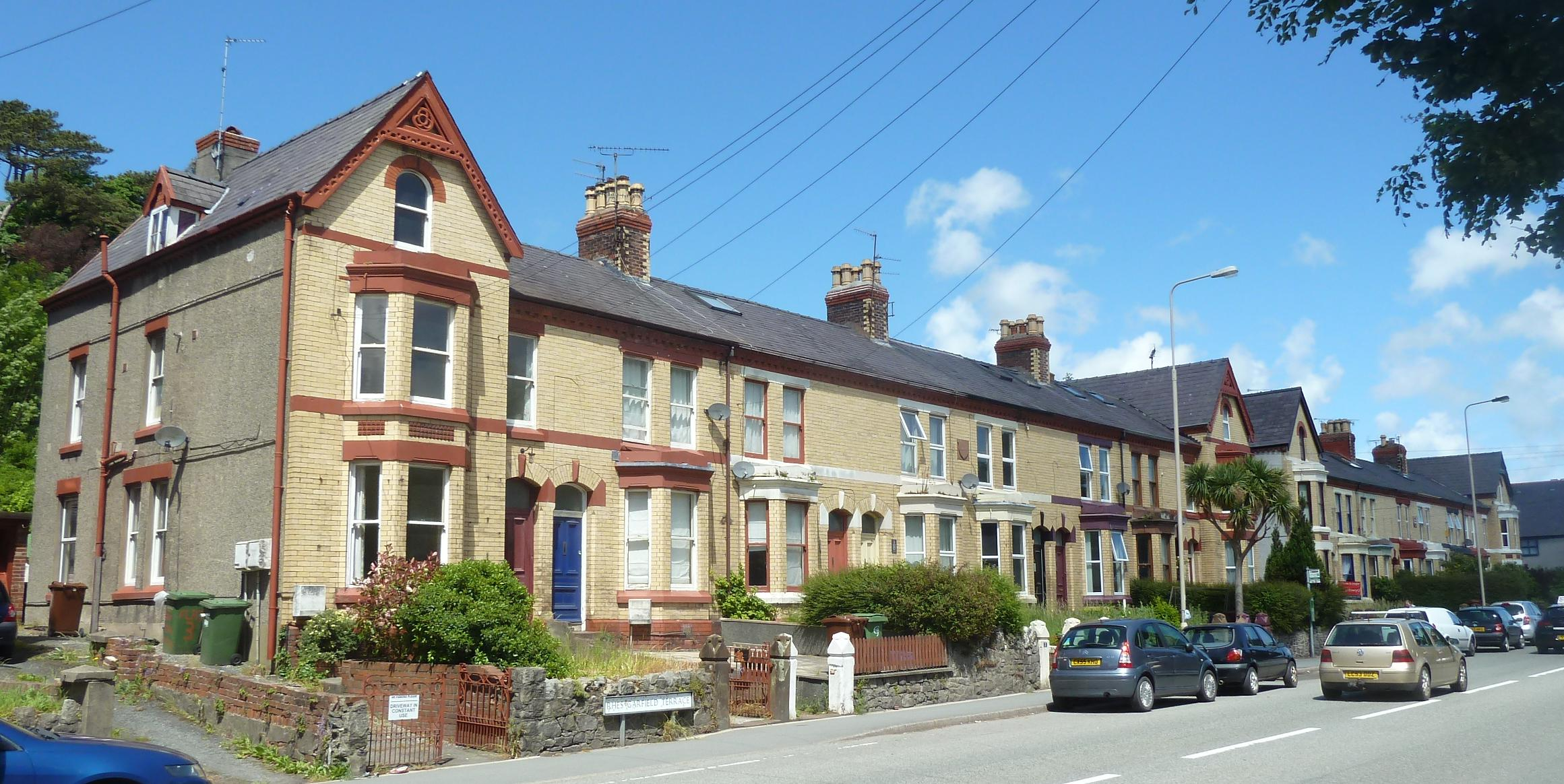
Bookend terrace in Bangor. One of three adjacent terraces each of eight houses along this road

A bookend terrace is a short row of terraced houses, where the two end houses of the terrace are larger than the others. This gives the visual effect of bookends.

== History ==
Bookend terraces in Britain first appeared in the late-Georgian period, as the combination of neo-classical architecture and the newly built terraces in the expanding cities. Typical terraces were identical throughout, but high-status developments, where space and budget permitted, might have a central protrusion to their facade or even a portico added as a feature. For prices between these ranges, the bookend terrace was a means to produce the symmetrical but non-uniform frontage demanded by the classical style, where the two end houses were distinguished by extra height or a protruding frontage, without involving the unprofitable extra cost and increased plot depth of the central portico.

In the Victorian period, terraces again became regular, then in the mid-Victorian period the Italianate style introduced entirely random variations between houses. The heyday of the bookend style was in the late-Victorian of the 1870s and 1880s, by which time domestic architecture had developed its own indigenous vernacular style. The ever-increasing demand for housing in the growing cities of this period led to house sizes shrinking, to match the shrinking households of fewer, and non-resident servants. Many of these new houses were of two storeys, not the previous three-plus-basement. This led to the most familiar style of bookend terrace: a row of between six and twelve houses in total, with the central ones being of two storeys with a longitudinal roof ridge. At each end is a house of the overall same plot size, but of three storeys and with its own independent roof and gables to front and back. The upper storey in these houses have two bedrooms, with sloping ceilings to their sides immediately beneath the roof, rather than having an attic space above. Prestige features, such as bay windows, may be more prominent in the end terraces; either fitted to the end houses alone, or used on both storeys rather than just the ground floor. As there is side access to the end houses, their main 'front' doors are often relocated to the ends walls and may be enclosed in a small porch, while the central houses have their door opening directly to the exterior.

Terraces of this style appeared throughout the UK, from the suburbs of cities to small villages. A common instance was around the newly developing branch line railway stations, often as the first 'modern' houses in a newly connected village.

The term is most used today in Australia, where it forms part of the estate agent's common descriptive vocabulary, although it is now largely used as a synonym for any 'end terrace' and the size variation is ignored.

== Bookend effect ==
An unrelated effect in terraced houses is the claimed 'bookend effect'. This claims that side loads from the central houses cause the end houses, particularly their end walls, to bulge outwards. The effect arises from cyclical expansion and contraction effects, both daily and annually. As the terrace expands, the end walls are pushed outwards, leading to cracking in walls or lozenge distortion of door and window frames. As the terrace contracts again, the usual weaknesses of building materials in tension cannot recover these movements entirely and the cracks remain. This effect is most pronounced in taller structures, those of four storeys and taller. The existence, or not, of this effect is itself controversial.
