= Jazz Bowl =

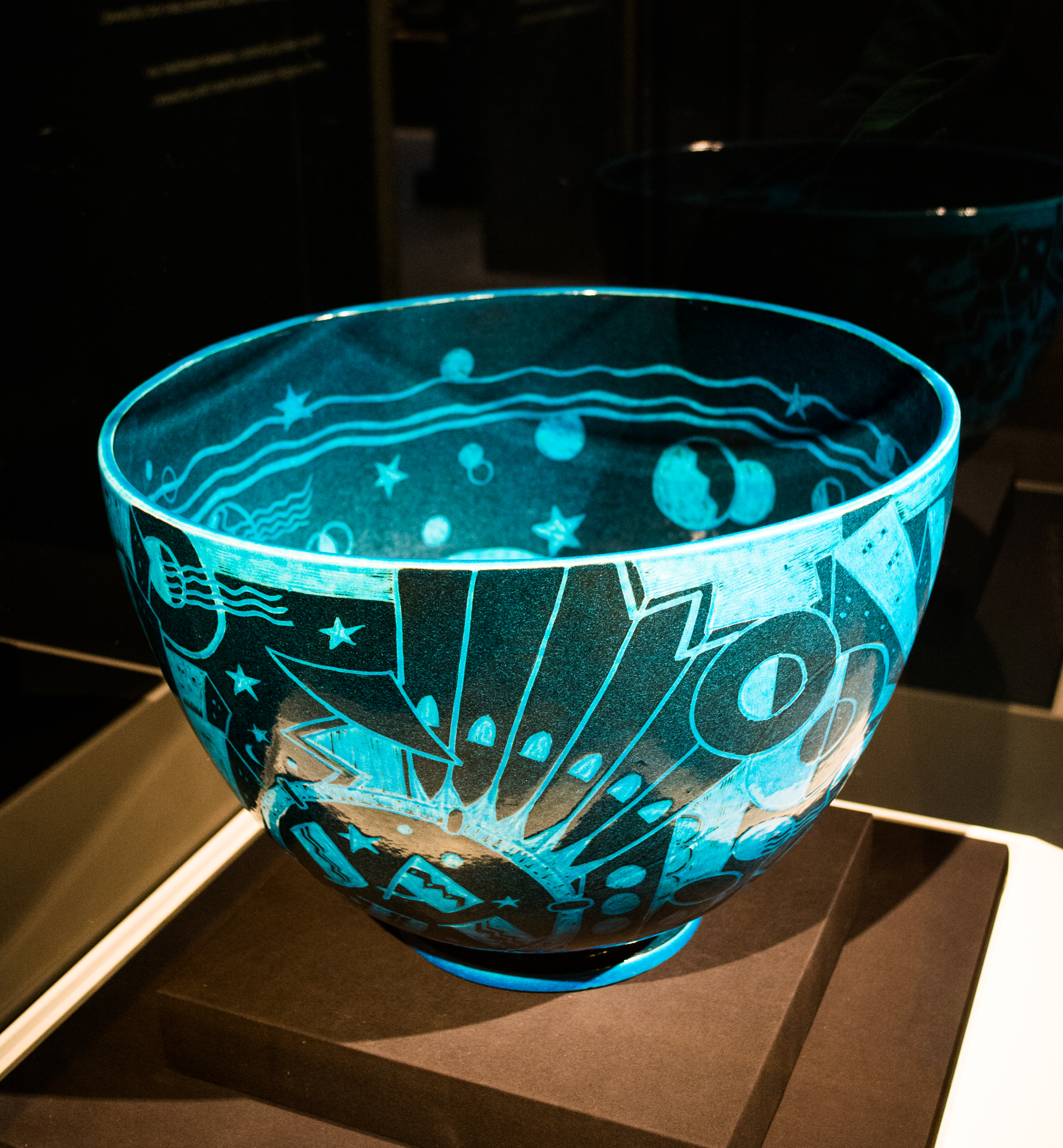
Jazz Bowl, properly New Yorker, punch bowl, designed by Viktor Schreckengost, made by Cowan Pottery, commissioned in 1930 by Eleanor Roosevelt to commemorate Franklin D. Roosevelt's second inauguration as governor of New York.

The New Yorker (a.k.a. The Jazz Bowl) is the name given to Viktor Schreckengost's best-known piece—a large, parabolic, Egyptian blue punch bowl commissioned by Eleanor Roosevelt in 1931. According to Schreckengost, Mrs. Roosevelt was so impressed that she quickly ordered 2 more: one for Hyde Park and one for the White House. The large bowl was then put into production by the Cowan Pottery, where at least 11 unique designs were executed (some in large numbers) including a flared variety (for stability in firing), less costly "Poor Man's Bowls" (with molded imagery rather than scratched) and matching plates—The Jazz Series. While the pieces gained much critical acclaim at the time, attention waned after the 1930s.

In 2006, Viktor reissued his Jazz Series, in cooperation with the Cleveland Institute of Art, where a team of 15 students took over the ceramics department to issue a second series of bowls and plates.

== General references ==
- The Cowan Potters, Inc., March 17, 1931, p. 2.
- Alastair Duncan, American Art Deco, New York, 1986, p. 117.
- Richard Guy Wilson, Dianne H. Pilgrim and Dickran Tashjian, The Machine Age in America, 1918–1941, New York, 1986. p. 291.
- Janet Kardon, ed., Craft in the Machine Age, 1920-1945: The History of Twentieth-Century American Craft, New York, 1995, p. 55.
- Karen McCready, Art Deco & Modernist Ceramics, London, 1995, p. 115.
- Henry Adams, Viktor Schreckengost and 20th-Century Design, Cleveland, 2000, cover and pp. xviii and 88–95.
