= Viktor Schreckengost =

American painter

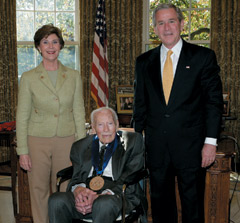
- First Lady Laura Bush, 100-year-old industrial designer Viktor Schreckengost, and U.S. President George W. Bush at the presentation of the 2006 National Medal of Arts in the Oval Office of the White House on November 9, 2006
- Born: June 26, 1906; Sebring, Ohio, United States
- Died: January 26, 2008 (aged 101); Tallahassee, Florida
- Occupation: Industrial designer

Viktor Schreckengost (June 26, 1906 – January 26, 2008) was an American industrial designer as well as a teacher, sculptor, and artist. His wide-ranging work included noted pottery designs, industrial design, bicycle design and seminal research on radar feedback. Schreckengost's peers included designers Raymond Loewy, Norman Bel Geddes, Eva Zeisel, and Russel Wright.

== Early life ==
Born and raised in Sebring, Ohio, Schreckengost was one of six children. His father worked at a ceramics factory from which he brought home material for his children to model. Every week he held a sculpture contest among the children, the winner of which accompanied his father on his weekend trip into the local big city, Alliance, Ohio. Only years later did Schreckengost realize that his father systematically rotated the winner. His younger brothers Donald and Paul Schreckengost also went on to careers as ceramicists.

Schreckengost graduated from the Cleveland School of the Arts (now the Cleveland Institute of Art) in 1929, at which time he earned a partial scholarship to study at the Kunstgewerbeschule in Vienna. To make the trip, he borrowed $1,500 from two owners of Gem Clay, an industrial ceramics manufacturer in Sebring. When he returned six months later, Schreckengost paid back his loans — a lucky event for the men from Gem Clay, since separate bank failures during the Great Depression would have otherwise wiped them out.

== Career ==
Schreckengost taught industrial design at the Cleveland Institute of Art (CIA) for more than 50 years and was a professor emeritus at CIA until his death. He was also the youngest faculty member ever at CIA (then known as the Cleveland School of the Arts). Schreckengost founded CIA's school of industrial design, the first of its kind in the country. His notable students include Giuseppe Delena, chief designer at Ford Motor Co.; Larry Nagode, principal designer at Fisher-Price (father of Ryan Nagode); Joe Oros, head of the studio at Ford that designed the 1965 Ford Mustang, Bill Saunders, Ryobi design director at Techtronic Industries, Sid Ramnarace, designer of the 5th generation Ford Mustang and Jerry Hirshberg, designer of the Infiniti J30 and the 1971 boat tail Buick Riviera.

Schreckengost enlisted in the Navy at age 37 to help the Allies in World War II. He was flown on secret missions to Europe, where he used his modeling knowledge to help improve the radar used in the Battle of the Bulge. Later he helped design prosthetics for wounded soldiers. He retired from the Naval Reserves as a captain. Schreckengost was also good friends with Cleveland safety director Eliot Ness.

== Designs ==
The Viktor Schreckengost Foundation homepage indicates:

Every adult in America has ridden in, ridden on, drunk out of, stored their things in, eaten off of, been costumed in, mowed their lawn with, played on, lit the night with, viewed in a museum, cooled their room with, read about, printed with, sat on, placed a call with, enjoyed in a theater, hid their hooch in, collected, been awarded with, seen at a zoo, put their flowers in, hung on their wall, served punch from, delivered milk in, read something printed on, seen at the World's Fair, detected enemy combatants with, written about, had an arm or leg replaced with, graduated from, protected by, or seen at the White House something created by Viktor Schreckengost.

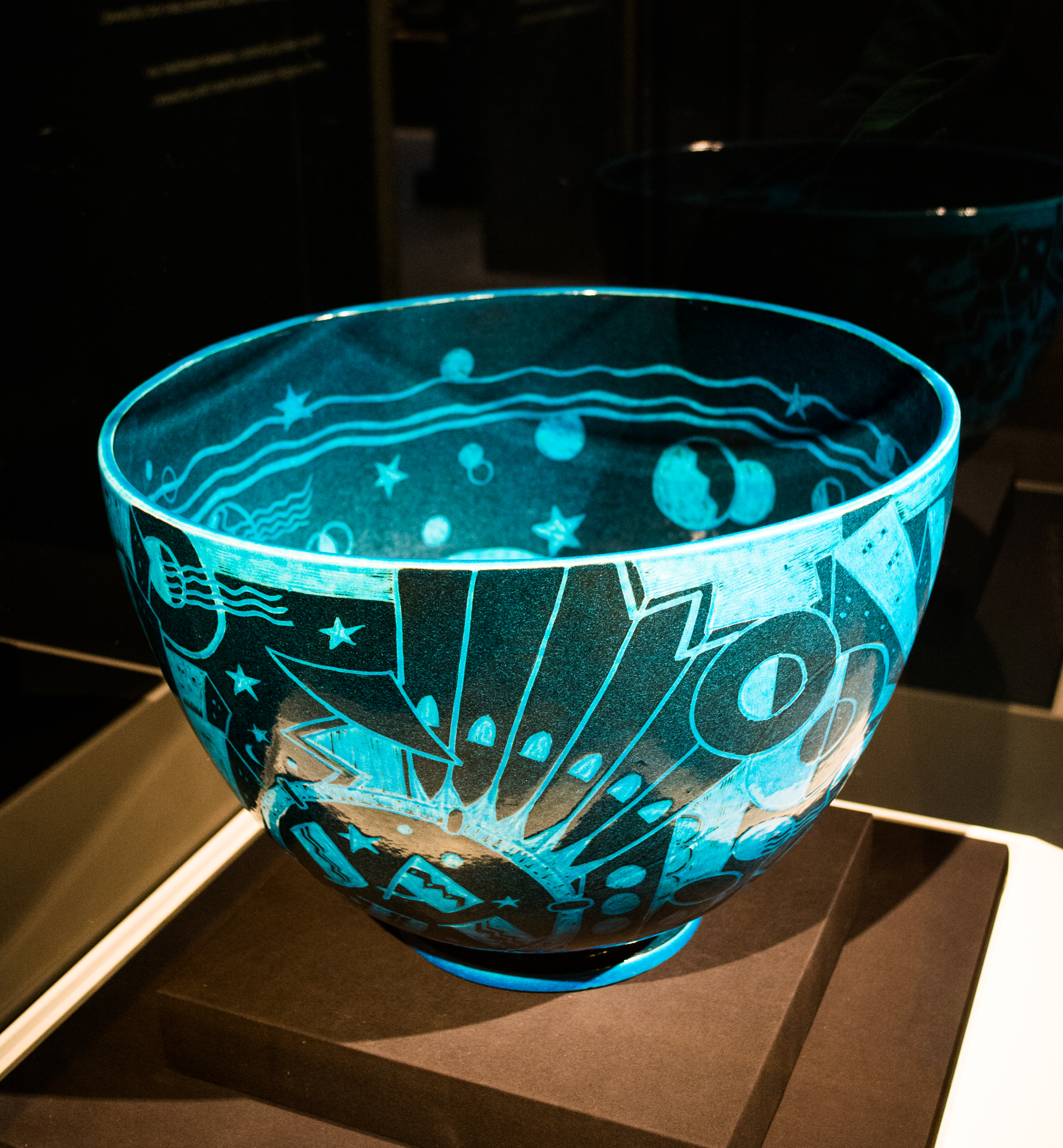
New Yorker punch bowl, Schrenkengost & Cowan Pottery, 1930, Cleveland Museum of Art

In 1930, Cowan Pottery received an order to create a "New-York-ish punch bowl" from Brownell-Lambertson Gallery on behalf of an undisclosed client. The project was assigned to their newest designer, Schreckengost, who would subsequently design the Jazz Bowl for Eleanor Roosevelt. She had special-ordered the item as a gift for Franklin D. Roosevelt to commemorate his second successful gubernatorial campaign. The bowl's popularity led to Cowan Pottery producing a collection of Schreckengost's New York designs on a variety of plates and bowls, until the sgraffito technique that the design relied on became too difficult to mass produce and the designs were discontinued.

He created (at the time) the largest freestanding ceramic sculpture in the world, Early Settler at Lakewood High School in Lakewood, Ohio. He designed bicycles manufactured by Murray bicycles for Murray and Sears, Roebuck and Company, chiefly the Mercury bicycle which was advertised as the "official bicycle" of the 1939 New York World's Fair where it was exhibited alongside some of his first sculptures.

While working at Cleveland's White Motor Company with engineer Ray Spiller, he designed the first truck with a cab-over-engine configuration, a design in use to this day. And he created simple, modern dinnerware designs that became popular throughout the United States.

Rather unknown remains an ironic work which Schreckengost created around 1942: Apocalypse '42 was launched a few months after the bombing of Pearl Harbor. "The image of a frightened horse bearing Hitler, Mussolini, Hirohito, and a figure of Death (in a German war uniform) across the globe was made to protest the rise of fascism. The drips of bloodred glaze around the horse's head and hooves were an unintentional effect of the firing process." Schreckengost's statement for this piece of art, addressing the Rome-Berlin-Tokyo Axis was: "I've always felt that you can say more with one vivid cartoon than you can with a lot of heavy words." A photo of the sculpture is used as material for history lessons in Germany.

Another restored and "forgotten" sculpture was planned to be revived at Cleveland Hopkins International Airport in late 2022 and finally reinstalled in November 2023.

== Tributes and legacy ==
Schreckengost lived in Cleveland Heights, Ohio, with his second wife Gene, and he celebrated his 100th birthday in June 2006. The Viktor Schreckengost Foundation planned more than 100 exhibits of his work, with at least one in each US state, to celebrate the milestone. The exhibits opened in March 100 days before his 100th birthday. Schreckengost attended an exhibit in New York City to open the shows. The night before his birthday he was honored at Cain Park in Cleveland Heights by a large and appreciative crowd. Also in 2006, Schreckengost was awarded the National Medal of Arts, the highest honor the federal government can bestow on an American artist. He and the nine other winners were feted in an Oval Office ceremony by President George W. Bush and the First Lady Laura Bush on November 9, 2006.

Schreckengost died on January 26, 2008. at age 101 while visiting family in Tallahassee, Florida, and was interred at Lake View Cemetery in Cleveland. He was predeceased by his three sisters, Pearl Eckleberry, Ruth Key, and Lucille Jackson, and his two brothers, Paul and Donald Schreckengost.

In 1976 a retrospective exhibition was organized by the Cleveland Institute of Art; then in 2000, the Cleveland Museum of Art curated a more comprehensive retrospective of Schreckengost's work. Broad in scope, the exhibition included sculpture, pottery, dinnerware, drawings, and paintings. The centerpiece of the exhibit was the Jazz Bowl. The industrial design portion included many of his famous designs such as safer and cleaner printing presses, economical pedal cars, cab-over-engine trucks, banana-seat bicycles, electric fans, and lawn chairs. Then in his 90s, Schreckengost made many personal appearances at the exhibit. In April 1991, Schreckengost traveled with Henry B. Adams, then curator of American Painting at the Cleveland Museum of Art, to Norfolk, Virginia, to address the Hampton Roads chapter of the American Institute of Architects at age 93.

In the early 2020s, a selection of Schreckengost's dinnerware and design drawings were donated to the International Museum of Dinnerware Design by the Schreckengost family, the gallery available to view on the museum's website.

=== Foundation and museum ===
In 2010, the Viktor Schreckengost Foundation signed a three-year contract to open a museum in the Tower Press Building in the St. Clair-Superior neighborhood of Cleveland, slated to open in the Spring of 2011. As the Foundation struggled to organize, plans for the museum were pushed back indefinitely. As of July 2014, much of the Schreckengost collection was being stored by Cleveland State University.

== See also ==
- Cleveland School
