= Walter Sinz =

American sculptor

Walter A. Sinz (July 13, 1881 – 1966) was an American sculptor born in Cleveland, Ohio. Among his best-known work was the Thompson Trophy. He was educated at the Cleveland School of Art, where he also taught from 1911 to 1952. In addition to his bronze and medal work, he designed figures for Cowan Pottery.
