= Cowan Pottery =

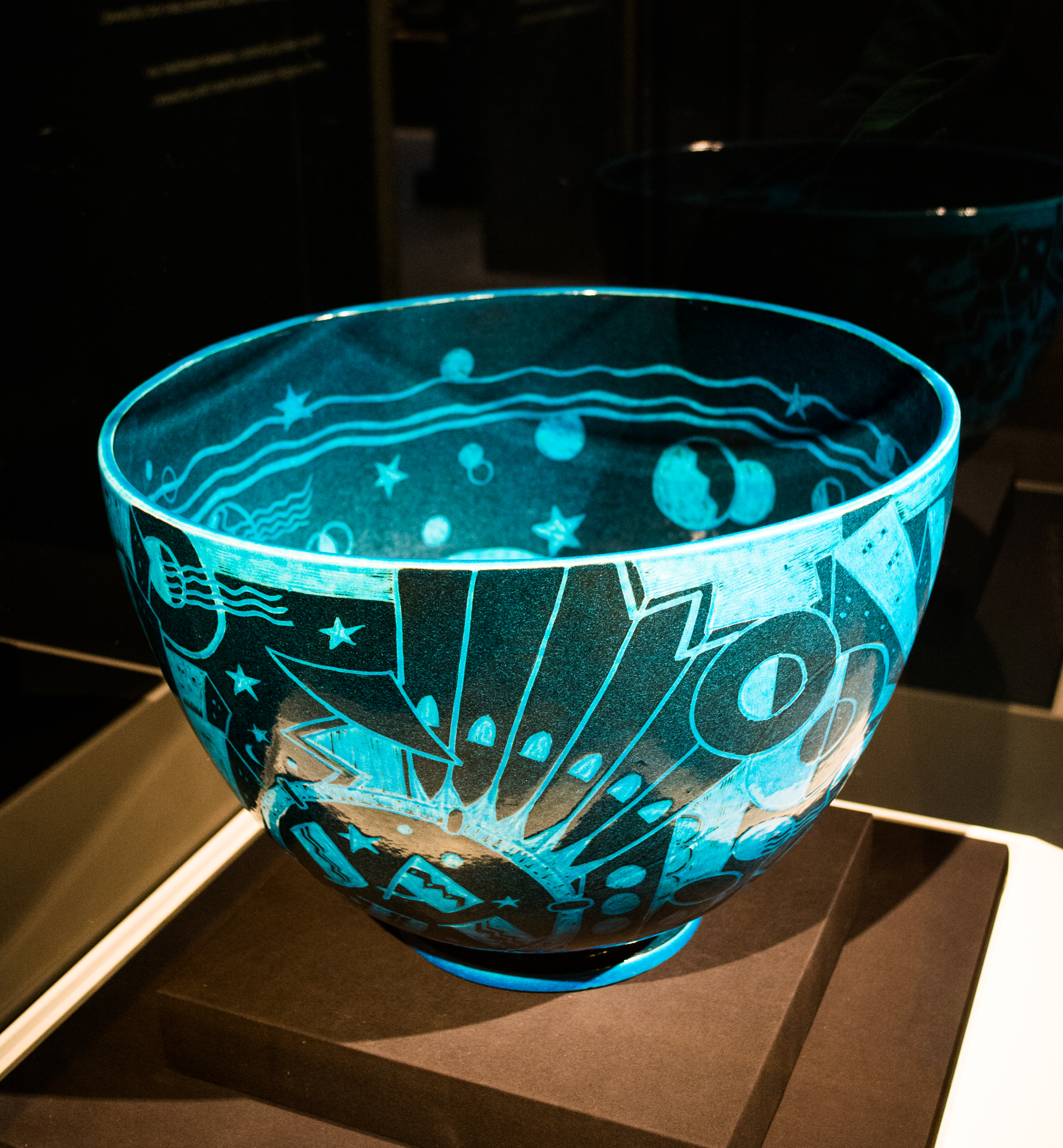
Jazz Bowl, properly New Yorker punch bowl, designed by Viktor Schreckengost, commissioned in 1930 by Eleanor Roosevelt to commemorate Franklin D. Roosevelt's second inauguration as governor of New York.

The Cowan Pottery Studio was founded by R. Guy Cowan in Lakewood, Ohio, United States in 1912. Cowan Pottery Studio mainly produced architectural tiles, but also created a line of bowls and vases called "Lakewood Ware."

== History ==
R. Guy Cowan first opened Cowan Pottery Studio in Lakewood, Ohio in 1912 and the studio produced architectural tiles and Lakewood Wares. Cowan Pottery produced both artistic and commercial work in a variety of styles. His pottery was influenced by the Arts and Crafts Movement, Art Deco designs, Chinese ceramics, and modern sculpture designs. Shortly after opening the studio, Cowan closed the studio to serve in the army during World War I. Upon returning home after the war in 1920, Cowan decided to move his pottery studio to 19633 Lake Road in Rocky River, Ohio.

Once in Rocky River, the studio shifted its pottery focus towards commercial production. Cowan hired a small staff number of well-known Cleveland School artists and by the mid-1920s a number of established artists came to work in his studio: Elizabeth Anderson, Arthur Eugene Baggs, Alexander Blazys, Paul Bogatay, Edris Eckhardt, Waylande Gregory, A. Drexler Jacobson, Raoul Josset, Paul Manship, José Martin, Herman Matzen, F. Luis Mora, Elmer L. Novotny, Margaret Postgate, Stephen Rebeck, Guy L. Rixford, Viktor Schreckengost, Elsa Vick Shaw, Walter Sinz, Frank N. Wilcox, H. Edward Winter, and Thelma Frazier Winter. Some of Cowan's students were not trained in ceramics prior to starting in his studio and had to be taught how to work with their hands. With the exception of Guy Cowan, himself, Waylande Gregory designed more pieces for the pottery studio than anyone else. Among Cowan's finest pieces were three limited edition figures relating to dance, including "Salome" (1928), "The Nautch Dancer," (1930), and "The Burlesque Dancer," (1930). For the last two, Gregory made sketches from the side of the stage of the well-known Ziegfeld Follies star, Gilda Grey, when she was performing in Cleveland. In the 1920s, Cowan Pottery Studio was successful and popular. R. Guy Cowan even used his national recognition and awards to advertise his pottery. His pottery was sold across the nation and Canada. In 1931, Cowan's business started to feel the financial stress of the Great Depression. Cowan could no longer afford to pay his bills or his employees. The pottery studio closed in December of 1931. As of 2024, the majority of the buildings that comprised Cowan Pottery in Rocky River still stand firm. Inside Rocky River Public Library, there is a museum devoted to Cowan Pottery.
