= R. Guy Cowan =

American potter and designer

- Born: August 1, 1884; East Liverpool, Ohio, U.S.
- Died: February 28, 1957 (aged 72); Tucson, Arizona, U.S.
- Education: New York State College of Ceramics at Alfred University
- Known for: Potter, designer

Reginald Guy Cowan (August 1, 1884 – February 28, 1957) was an American potter and designer. He founded Cowan Pottery, and was a leading figure in the Cleveland School of artists.

Cowan was born in East Liverpool, Ohio. He lived in Chittenango, New York before attending the New York State College of Ceramics at Alfred University. While at Alfred, he was the captain of the Alfred Saxons football team, in 1906. Cowan is also credited as the head coach for 1906 Alfred football team, which compiled a record of 1–2–1.

Cowan taught at the Cleveland School of Art—now known as the Cleveland Institute of Art. His ceramic work named "Madonna" was owned by and exhibited at the Cleveland Museum of Art. In 1930s, Cowan left Cleveland, and moved Syracuse, New York, where he was a consultant for Onondaga Pottery, Co., a manufacturer of fine china. He died of a heart attack, on February 28, 1957, in Tucson, Arizona.

== Head coaching record ==
Year	Team	Overall	Conference	Standing	Bowl/playoffs
Alfred Saxons (Independent) (1906)
1906	Alfred	1–2–1			
Alfred:		1–2–1			
Total:		1–2–1			
