= Cleveland School (arts community) =

Arts community in Ohio, United States

The Cleveland School refers to the flourishing local arts community in Cleveland and Northeast Ohio during the period from 1910 to 1960. It was so named in 1928 by Elrick Davis, a journalist with the Cleveland Press. The Cleveland School was renowned for its watercolor painting, and also included well-known printmakers, sculptors, enamelists, and ceramists.

Artists of the Cleveland School were involved with the founding of the Cleveland School of Art (now Cleveland Institute of Art), the Cleveland Museum of Art, Cleveland Society of Artists, Kokoon Arts Club, and Cleveland's annual May Show.

== Cleveland School artists ==
- George Adomeit
- Russell B. Aitken
- Richard Anuszkiewicz
- Whitney Atchley
- Kenneth F. Bates
- Joseph Boersig
- August Biehle
- Lawrence Edwin Blazey
- Alexander Blazys
- Paul Bogatay
- Jack M. Burton
- Elmer Brubeck
- Charles E. Burchfield
- Martha Burchfield
- Clarence H. Carter
- Claude Conover
- R. Guy Cowan
- Paul Dominey
- László Dús
- Nora E. Dyer
- Harold Edward
- Edris (Edith Aline) Eckhardt
- W. Leroy Flint
- Carl Gaertner
- Clement and Fern Giorgi
- Frederick Gottwald
- Waylande Gregory
- Doris Hall
- Harold W. Hunsicker
- A. Drexler Jacobson
- Joseph W. Jicha
- Max Kalish
- Henry Keller
- Grace V. Kelly
- Kalman Kubinyi
- Robert Laessig
- Charles Lakovsky
- Fred Leach
- Hughie Lee-Smith
- Norman E. Magden
- Herman Matzen
- Alice McGinty
- Leza and William McVey
- Carl Moellman
- Joseph Motto
- Charles Murphy
- Horace Potter
- Steven A. Rebeck
- Louis Rorimer
- Charles L. Sallée Jr
- Viktor Schreckengost
- Walt Scott
- Sam Scott
- Marvin Smith (artist)
- Elizabeth Andersen Seaver
- Glen Moore and Elsa Vick Shaw
- William Sommer
- Esther Marshall Sills
- Walter Sinz
- Drew Smith
- Julian Stanczak
- Rolf Stoll
- Paul Travis
- Abel and Alexander Warshawsky
- Frank N. Wilcox
- Sandor Vago
- H. Edward Winter
- Thelma Frazier Winter

== See also ==
- Cleveland Artists Foundation
