= Adomeit =

Adomeit is a Germanized form of the Baltic-origin surname Adomaitis meaning "son of Adam". Notable people with the surname include:

- Caroline Adomeit, German violinist and composer
- George Adomeit (1879–1967), American painter and printmaker
- Hannes Adomeit (1942 – 2022), German political scientist and analyst
- Kai Adomeit (born 1968), German pianist
- Katja Adomeit, Danish film producer and director
- Klaus Adomeit (1935–2019), German legal scholar
- Martin Adomeit (born 1963), German table tennis coach
- Ruth E. Adomeit (1910–1996), American author, editor, collector of miniature books and philanthropist; daughter of George

== See also ==
- Adomaitis (Lithuanian form)
- (Horst) Ademeit (similar name)
