= Sheffield Kagy =

American painter

Sheffield Harold Kagy (1907–1989) was an American printmaker and muralist who also worked with Everett Warner to design US Navy camouflage during World War II.

== Biography ==
Active as a printmaker in Cleveland in the 1930s, Sheffield Kagy specialized in block prints of contemporary scenes. Born and raised in Cleveland, he studied with Henry Keller and Paul Travis at the Cleveland School of Art and with Ernest Fiene at the Corcoran School of Art in Washington, D.C. In 1932, Kagy opened the short-lived Sheffield Studio School of Art in Cleveland, which offered basic art instruction taught by a faculty that included Kalman Kubinyi.

Kagy was one of only two Cleveland artists to make prints for the Public Works of Art Project in 1934. He made several linoleum cuts and at least one lithograph for the Cleveland graphic arts project of the Works Progress Administration in 1936. Kagy was a vice president of the Cleveland Print Makers and showed his work in many local exhibitions including several May Shows (1931–1941). He participated in annual print exhibitions in Chicago, Cleveland, and Dayton, and his work also appeared in New York City, Washington, D.C., and Venice, Italy. Kagy moved to Washington in 1936 and taught fine arts and printmaking at the Abbott Art School. He worked for the U.S. Treasury Department, 1937–1940, and painted murals for post offices in Walterboro, South Carolina, and Luray, Virginia.

Modeled on the Cleveland Print Makers, Kagy organized the Washington Print Maker's Club in 1940, whose members included Herman Maril and Prentiss Taylor. Kagy was head of the art department at Chevy Chase Junior College in Maryland, 1940–1943, then served in the navy as a camouflage designer for the Bureau of Ships until 1945. After the war he became a professor of fine arts at the National Art School, a post he held until 1956. He was an exhibition officer and designer for the State Department from 1959 to 1973. Kagy died in Washington.

== Examples ==
- Kagy's prints can be viewed via OhioLINK in the WPA Prints by Cleveland Artists collection.
- Kagy's prints in Digital Case, the Digital Library of Case Western Reserve University.
- Sheffield Kagy's work at Cleveland Public Library
