= Frank N. Wilcox =

American painter

- Frank N. Wilcox 1 photographic print: black and white; 13 x 14 cm. Courtesy of the Frank N. Wilcox papers, 1906-1976, Archives of American Art, Smithsonian Institution.
- Born: October 3, 1887; Cleveland, Ohio
- Died: April 17, 1964 (aged 76); Cleveland, Ohio
- Education: Cleveland School of Art, 1906-1910, taught 1913-1953
- Known for: Watercolor Painting, Drawing, Printmaking

Frank Nelson Wilcox (October 3, 1887 – April 17, 1964) was a modernist American artist and a master of watercolor. Wilcox is described as the "Dean of Cleveland School painters," though some sources give this appellation to Henry Keller or Frederick Gottwald.

== Life ==
Frank Nelson Wilcox, Jr. was born on October 3, 1887, the second of three children to Frank Nelson Wilcox and Jessie Fremont Snow Wilcox at 61 Linwood Street in Cleveland, Ohio. His brother, lawyer and publisher Owen N. Wilcox, was president of the Gates Legal Publishing Company or The Gates Press. His sister Ruth Wilcox was a respected librarian.

Wilcox grew up in Cleveland and frequently visited nearby Brecksville, Ohio, where his family had a farm. While attending Cleveland's Central High School, he took sketch classes from Gottwald at the old Wilson Avenue building of the Cleveland School of Art. His father, a prominent lawyer, died at home in 1904 shortly before Wilcox' 17th birthday.

In 1906 Wilcox enrolled in the Cleveland School of Art under the tutelage of Gottwald, Keller, Louis Rorimer, Horace Potter, and Herman Matzen. He also attended Keller's Berlin Heights summer school beginning in 1909. After graduating in 1910, Wilcox traveled and studied in Europe for a year with his cousin Kenneth Payne. Wilcox preferred sketching and painting outdoors on the streets of Paris to attending classes, but he went often to evening sketch classes at the Académie de la Grande Chaumière. He met a fellow Clevelander, William Zorach (then known as William Finkelstein), at the Louvre. Zorach tried to interest Wilcox in Post-Impressionism and took him to Académie Colarossi. Wilcox, interested in original research, disliked Post-Impressionism at the time. In 1911 one of his sketches was accepted for exhibition at the Salon, which led to financial contributions from his father's friends.

On return to Cleveland, Wilcox was disappointed by Keller's reaction to his Paris work. Keller called them "mere colored drawings" and expressed the view that Wilcox should have paid attention to Post-Impressionism while in France. In August 2011, an exhibition of Wilcox' paintings at the Taylor Galleries was enthusiastically received and helped restore his enthusiasm.

During his second year at Berlin Heights, Keller insisted Wilcox express himself post-impressionistically. He did, and became convinced of its value. The same year Wilcox became acquainted with fellow artist Florence Bard, whom he would later marry. He had been making a little money working at Potter's studio and Cowan Pottery, and now felt the need to earn more and move out on his own. He joined the Cleveland School of Art faculty in 1913. Among his students were Lawrence Edwin Blazey, Carl Gaertner, Paul Travis, Charles E. Burchfield, and Victor Schreckengost.

In his first year of teaching, Wilcox requested the final month off and sailed to Rotterdam, Netherlands in May, 1914. Sketching his way through the Netherlands, Belgium, and Germany in the final days of the Belle Époque, he found himself in Munich when World War I broke out. He left for Antwerp to return home, but had to return to Germany because he could not exchange his money. There the Germans arrested him twice the same day in Cologne on suspicion of espionage. His steamship ticket allowed his release, and he took a train to Rotterdam. Here he caught the last ship for New York. Liege had already fallen.

Wilcox married Bard in 1916, and they spent most of their honeymoon painting in Berlin Heights with Keller. They had one daughter, Mary. In 1918 he joined the Cleveland Society of Artists, a conservative counter to the Bohemian Kokoon Arts Club to which Wilcox also belonged, and would later serve as its president. He also began teaching night school at the John Huntington Polytechnic Institute at this time, and taught briefly during his retirement at Baldwin-Wallace College.

Wilcox traveled and painted extensively throughout his life, but never learned to drive. Affected by palsy in his later years, his hands would shake until his brush touched the paper, then would become steady until the stroke was complete. Wilcox died on April 17, 1964, having taught at the Cleveland School of Art (now Cleveland Institute of Art or CIA) for over 40 years. Today CIA awards an annual scholarship prize in his name to students majoring in printmaking.

== Work ==
Wilcox was influenced by Keller's innovative watercolor techniques, and from 1910 to 1916 they experimented together with Impressionism and Post-Impressionism. Wilcox soon developed his own signature style in the American Scene or Regionalist tradition of the early 20th century.

Wilcox created a large volume of sketches and watercolor paintings during his first two trips to Europe. At this time Wilcox generally preferred to work en plein air, painting over pencil sketches. He viewed his painting of the Tour Saint-Jacques as a major event n his artistic development.

The watercolors painted on this European trip were done in color values supported by pencil accents – a method which I stumbled upon and which proved speedy and effective. My very first efforts were disappointing until I hit upon this process augmented by using a white wax pencil as a stop-out for small areas of isolated whiteness. This is the method which I applied to a sketch of the Tour St. Jacques. This handling was the second long stride in my technical development, the first being my use of pencil in the sketch class at the old Wilson Avenue School.

Wilcox described having been hired by Matzen to draw the frieze of figures for the base of the Tom L. Johnson statue on the Cleveland public square, unveiled in 1915. The frieze depicts nude figures crawling through the brambles of adversity.

Wilcox taught himself etching and printmaking during his second summer at Berlin Heights, at first using an old clothes wringer to make prints. He went on to make commercial etchings for years. In the 1930s, Cleveland printmarker Kálmán Kubinyi discovered two bushels of Wilcox etchings from which is produced a small edition. Wilcox was one of several Cleveland School artists contributing to Kubinyi's Print-a-Month Club, published by the Cleveland Print Makers from 1932 to 1937.

On trips to Boothbay, Maine with Otto Ege shortly after World War I, Wilcox developed his pure watercolor skills. For these paintings he used bold colors and broad strokes, no longer starting with detailed pencil sketches. Wilcox viewed this work as his next major milestone since Paris.

The work I did at Boothbay was the first real step forward for me since my Paris days. One can, after a time, look back and see these milestones of technical and perceptive progress. These sketches were fuller in tone and not dependent upon a linear support to hold them together. I took great pleasure in directly molding the rock formations and contrasting them with fluid skies. Also, the drawing of boats no longer seemed to result in a tightness of treatment.

Wilcox painted many outdoor scenes from trips to the Gaspé Peninsula in Quebec, Canada, the deep south, the Rocky Mountains, and particularly Ohio. From his summers at Berlin Heights and throughout his career, Wilcox frequently painted scenes of Ohio, Clevelend, and especially Brecksville. Many of his works depict nostalgic scenes from his youth.

Wilcox wrote and illustrated Ohio Indian Trails in 1933, which was favorably reviewed by The New York Times in 1934. This book was edited and reprinted in 1970 by William A. McGill. McGill also edited and reprinted Wilcox' Canals of the Old Northwest in 1969. Wilcox also wrote, illustrated, and published Weather Wisdom in 1949, a limited edition (50 copies) of twenty-four serigraphs (silk screened prints) accompanied by commentary "based upon familiar weather observations commonly made by people living in the country."

In retirement, Wilcox painted a series dubbed "Little-Big" by Norman Kent, editor of American Artist. The Little-Big paintings were largely nostalgic pictures of Ohio's past, in ink and watercolor on paper. The article focuses on the works and artistic style of Frank N. Wilcox, a watercolor painter based in Cleveland, Ohio. He says that he selects his subject based on a response to the most vital visual impressions. Wilcox uses flat, round and pointed sable brushes. He prefers to paint the Ohio landscape and uses several palettes for it including yellow, ochre, cadmium yellow pale and burnt sienna. His works are usually mounted on a 22 by 30 inches paper. Several examples of his paintings are provided.

The Cleveland Museum of Art lists over 40 works by Wilcox in its collection. One copy of his 1928 etching Fisherman of Percé, Quebec is reposited with the U.S. Library of Congress.

Wilcox displayed over 250 works at Cleveland's annual May Show. He received numerous awards, including the Penton Medal for as The Omnibus, Paris (1920), Fish Tug on Lake Erie (1921), Blacksmith Shop (1922), and The Gravel Pit (1922). Other paintings include The Trailing Fog (1929), Under the Big Top (1930), and Ohio Landscape (1932).

== Recent exhibitions ==
The Dean: Frank Nelson Wilcox (1887-1964) was an exhibition of over 200 works depicting American scene, Europe, the Northeast Coast, and American west, spanning much of Wilcox's career. The exhibition included works from the Wilcox Estate, and was presented at Wolfs Gallery in Cleveland from September 19 through November 30, 2019.

Frank N. Wilcox: Artist as Historian was an exhibition on Wilcox's work relating to the history of Cleveland and its surrounding Ohio environs. Curated by William G. Scheele, with the assistance of the Wilcox Estate, the exhibition ran from November 27, 2015, through April 30, 2016 at the Cleveland History Center in University Circle, Cleveland, Ohio. Wilcox came from a large family with New England ancestry on both sides, all of whom played a significant role in settling Ohio's Western Reserve. The Wilcox and Snow families offered young Frank exposure to both city and country life, which is reflected in his work and in family photographs. A companion gallery illustrated the Wilcox and Snow family history and took a look at Frank Wilcox, the man.

A Buckeye Abroad: Frank Wilcox Paints Paris and Europe was an exhibition of 50 watercolors from Wilcox's first years in France and Europe - paintings that were pivotal in establishing the painter's style. Curated by American Art historian and Case Western Reserve University professor Dr. Henry Adams, the exhibition was presented by Tregoning & Co. in Cleveland from October 19, 2012, to January 5, 2013, and by the Dayton Art Institute in Dayton, Ohio from August 24, 2013, to January 5, 2014. A National Public Radio (NPR) interview on the exhibit and artist is in External Links below.

A Brush with Light: Watercolor Painters of Northeast Ohio was an exhibition featuring works by 25 Cleveland School artists, including Wilcox. Organized by the Cleveland Artists Foundation (now ARTneo), the exhibit ran from April 23 through July 10, 1999 at the Ohio Arts Council's Riffe Gallery. The exhibit catalog included an article by Wilcox titled Essentials of Pictorial Expressionism.
