= Leo Nowak (artist) =

American illustrator

Leo Nowak

Leonard "Leo" Nowak (December 24, 1907 in Elizabeth, New Jersey – January 6, 2001 in Inyokern, California) was an American illustrator known for his work on Superman during the Golden Age of Comic Books, when he was one of Joe Shuster's assistants. In this role, he was the first (in both the comic strip and the comic book) to portray Lex Luthor as bald; in Luthor's earlier appearances, he had red hair.

Prior to joining Shuster, Nowak had studied art with Frank N. Wilcox and Henry Keller, but instead worked as a musician. One day, during his time off, Nowak painted a mural in a nightclub where he played regularly; a salesman who admired the work told Nowak that Siegel and Shuster were looking for artistic assistance. Nowak visited their studio and was hired immediately.

In 1942, Nowak co-created (with Jerry Siegel) the first character to be known as Robotman.

In 1943, Nowak was drafted into the United States Army, and left comics.

In the 1970s, Nowak moved to Inyokern, where he became a political cartoonist.
