= Biehle =

Biehle may refer to:

- Biehle, Missouri, a village in Perry County, Missouri, United States

== People with the surname ==
- Alfred Biehle (1926–2014), German politician
- August Biehle (1885–1979), American Modernist painter
