= Martin Linsey =

Artist from Cleveland, US (1915–2010)

- Born: November 20, 1915; Cleveland, Ohio, United States
- Died: March 3, 2010 (aged 94); Los Lunas, New Mexico
- Occupations: Artist, Educator
- Known for: Painting, drawing, and photography
- Children: 3

Martin Linsey (November 20, 1915 – March 3, 2010) was an American painter and photographer.

== Early life and education ==
Born in Cleveland, Ohio, Martin Linsey was raised in Cleveland Heights. He studied at the Cleveland School of Art from 1936 to 1938.

In 1941, Linsey was refused entry into the U.S. Marine Corps due to color blindness. Instead, he joined the army and helped draft maps of combat zones in Italy, France, and Germany.

He later earned a bachelor's degree in education from the University of Miami in 1950, and a Masters in art history from Western Reserve University in 1951.

== Career ==
Linsey's artistic output was originally inspired by his time working around shrimp fishing boats and yachts in the Bahamas and Florida. He continued to paint and draw scenes based on his travels and the places he lived.

A longtime exhibitor at the museum in their May Shows, Linsey joined the Cleveland Museum of Art as an educator in 1960. He taught children's classes and led tours. Linsey also practiced photography for the museum's publications and other publishers. While working at the museum, he hosted and chauffeured Agatha Christie and her husband while they were visiting for a talk.

Linsey retired to Scottsdale, Arizona in 1980. While there, he was a volunteer photographer for the Phoenix Art Museum.

== Legacy ==
Linsey's work is collected by the Cleveland Museum of Art.

== See also ==
- Cleveland School
