= William McVey =

William McVey may refer to:

- William E. McVey, member of the U.S. House of Representatives
- William McVey (sculptor), American sculptor, animalier and teacher
