= Frank Wilcox (disambiguation) =

Frank Wilcox (1907–1974) was an American character actor.

Frank Wilcox may also refer to:

- Frank N. Wilcox (1887–1964), American artist

== See also ==
- Frank Wilcoxon (1892–1965), American chemist
