= Grace V. Kelly =

American painter (1877–1950)

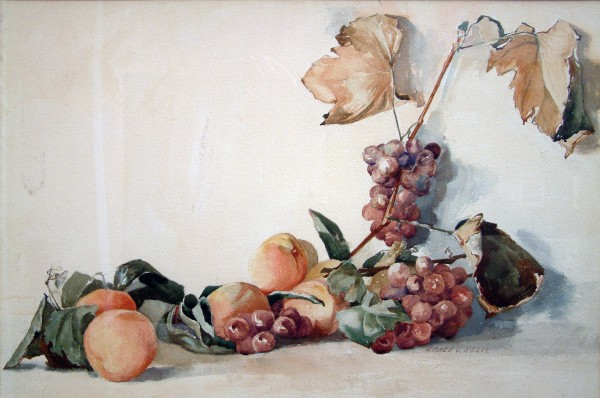
Autumn Still Life, a c. 1904 watercolor, is in the collection of ARTneo.

Grace Veronica Kelly (January 31, 1877 – January 10, 1950) was an American painter and art critic. An accomplished watercolorist, she was a member of the Cleveland School of artists, and served as The Plain Dealer's principal art critic from 1926 to 1949.

== Biography ==
Kelly was born in Cleveland. Her parents were Thomas and Mary Hart Kelly, Irish immigrants. At age 15, she entered the Cleveland School of Art, studying under painter Henry Keller. After graduating, she served as an instructor there until 1904, when she left to begin work as a commercial artist. She helped found the Cleveland Women's Art Club in 1912, and exhibited there throughout her career. In 1926, her writing gained the attention of Plain Dealer editor Erie C. Hopwood, who invited her to become the newspaper's art critic. Her stories on the Guelph Treasure in 1931 helped the Cleveland Museum of Art draw record crowds to view the objects. An avid traveler, she visited Ireland and Guatemala, painting those areas in addition to her Northeast Ohio home.

Kelly suffered a stroke in November 1949 and died the following January at the age of 73. The Plain Dealer's editorial page wrote that her colleagues would "long cherish the memory of an artist and writer who enriched their lives with Irish wit and points of view that opened up picturesque vistas that otherwise would have been missed." She never married, and was survived by her brother, John, and three sisters, Mary, Julia, and Maria.

== Exhibitions ==
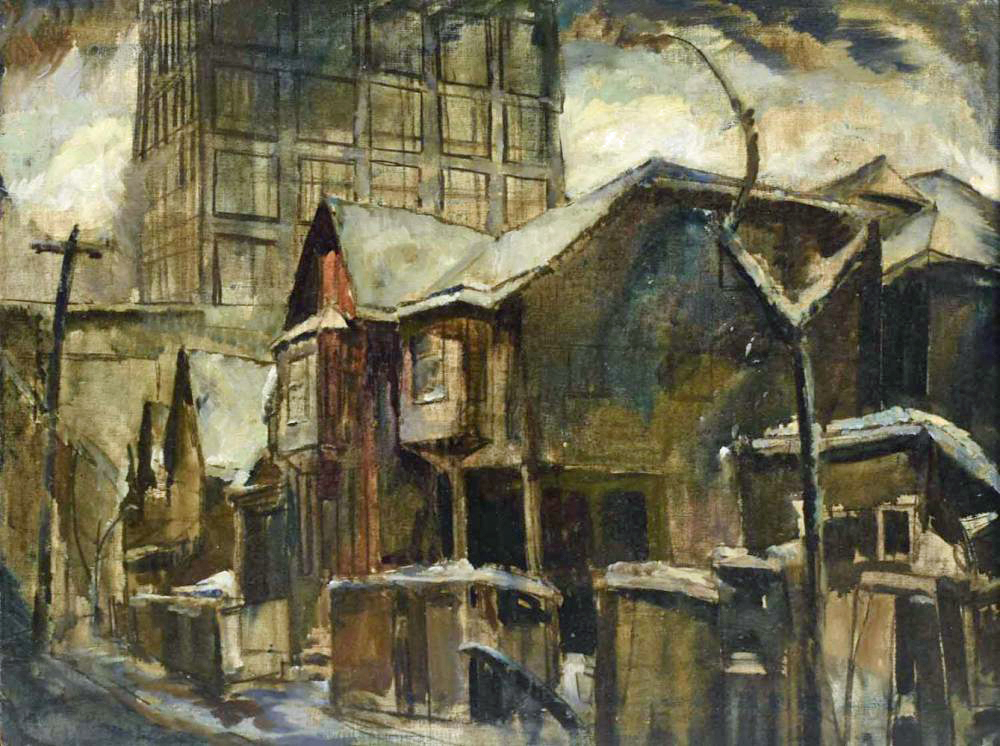
Cleveland, Ohio by Kelly.

Kelly's paintings can be found in the collection of the Cleveland Museum of Art. She was a regular participant in the museum's May Show, an annual juried exhibition of works by Northeast Ohio artists. She exhibited 151 paintings there between 1919 and 1950, winning multiple awards.

Four of her works were included in the Brooklyn Museum's 1931 Exhibition of Water Colors, Pastels Drawings And Miniatures By American & Foreign Artists, which took place January 23 through February 24, 1931 and also featured works by George Pearse Ennis, Wassily Kandinsky, Paul Klee, and Roderick Fletcher Mead.

The Cleveland Women's Club displayed 70 of her works in 1947. In 1998 and 1999, her work was shown along others in an exhibition organized by the Cleveland Artists Foundation and titled A Brush With Light: Watercolor Painters of Northeast Ohio. The exhibition was also displayed at the Ohio Arts Council's Riffe Gallery in Columbus, Ohio. In 2003, her work was part of the Springfield Museum of Art's show In A Clear Light: The Triumph Of Ohio Watercolor Painters, 1870-1967. Her paintings were also included in the Canton Museum of Art's The Cleveland School: Watercolor and Clay exhibit in 2012 and 2013.
