= David Reed (artist) =

American painter

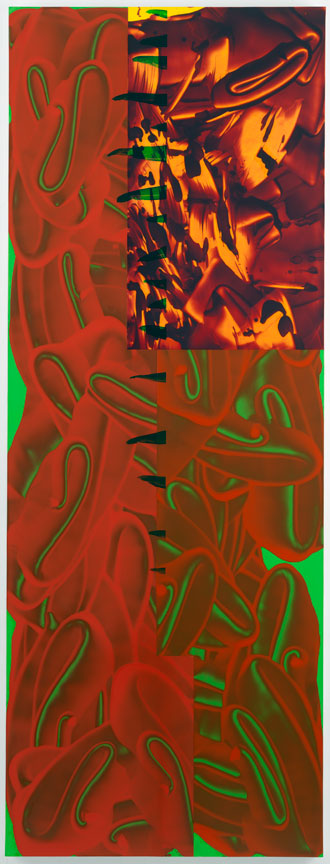
- Painting #580 by David Reed, 2006-2008
- Born: 1946 (age 79–80); San Diego, California
- Education: Reed College; New York Studio School of Drawing, Painting and Sculpture
- Known for: Painting
- Website: davidreedstudio.com

David Reed (born 1946) is a contemporary American conceptual and visual artist.

== Art ==
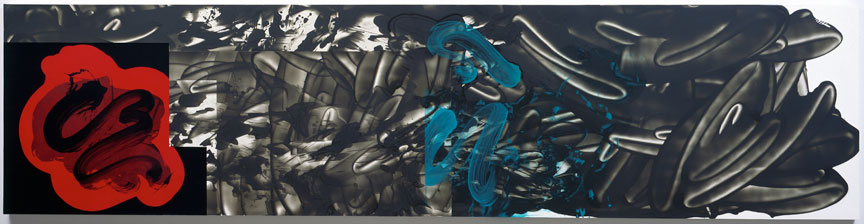
Painting #576 by David Reed, 2007

David Reed is known as a colorist and for creating long, narrow abstract paintings on canvas that are hung either lengthwise or vertically and feature several images resembling enlarged photographs of swirling brushstrokes juxtaposed in a single painting. Reed's paintings are engaged in a crossover between film, the electronic media and everyday culture. Besides being a fine arts painter, he is also an installation sculptor, a video artist, a lecturer on contemporary art and art history, and an exhibition curator. He has a fondness for the art from the Baroque and works by Degas and Delacroix.

=== Vertigo Project ===
In discussing paintings by John McLaughlin, the artist and dealer Nicholas Wilder once remarked to David Reed that owners of his paintings often move them into their bedrooms, in order to live with them more intimately. Reed saw in this practice his own aspiration to be a "bedroom painter." For his project "Two Bedrooms in San Francisco," Reed inserted images of his paintings into scenes from Alfred Hitchcock's Vertigo (film), which take place in the bedrooms of the film's two main characters, Judy and Scottie. The modified film clips run continuously on television monitors as part of ensembles, which include life-size replicas of the two beds as they appear in the film and the very paintings that had been inserted in the film.

== High Times, Hard Times: New York Painting 1967-1975 ==
David Reed was the adviser for the exhibition High Times, Hard Times: New York Painting 1967-1975 curated by Katy Siegel, which traveled to Weatherspoon Art Museum, University of North Carolina at Greensboro in North Carolina from August 6 to October 15, 2006; Katzen Arts Center at American University in Washington, D.C., from November 21, 2006, to January 21, 2007; National Academy of Design in New York City from February 15 to April 22, 2007; Tamayo Contemporary Art Museum in Mexico City from May 25 to September 9, 2007; Neue Galerie Graz in Graz from December 14, 2007, to February 24, 2008; and Center for Art and Media Karlsruhe in Karlsruhe from March 28 to June 1, 2008.

== Life ==
David Reed grew up in California. He attended the Skowhegan School of Painting and Sculpture in Skowhegan, Maine, in 1966 and the New York Studio School in New York, where he studied primarily with Milton Resnick as well as Mercedes Matter and Esteban Vicente while on a Rockefeller Foundation Fellowship in 1967. He received his Bachelor of Arts degree from Reed College in Portland, Oregon, in 1968. After getting his degree, he moved to New York City and, though he wasn't officially enrolled at the New York Studio School at the time, he attended Philip Guston's seminar there and continued to participate in other activities at the school. He has lived and worked in the city continuously since 1971. In 1969 he had a son, the novelist John Reed. His uncle O.P., aunt Rosemary, and great-uncle August Biehle, were all painters. As a gallerist, O.P. discovered John McLaughlin (artist), later a great influence on Reed as a teenager.

David Reed is the recipient of many awards, including the Roswell Museum and Art Center grant, the John Simon Guggenheim Memorial Foundation Fellowship, the National Endowment for the Arts Visual Arts Fellowship, and the Ursula Blickle Foundation Art Award. Reed is a member and President Emeritus of American Abstract Artists.

He is represented by Gagosian Gallery, Gallery Nathalie Obadia, Galerie Anke Schmidt in Cologne, Germany, and Häusler Contemporary in Zurich, Switzerland. His works on paper are represented by Peter Blum Gallery in New York.

== Museum collections ==
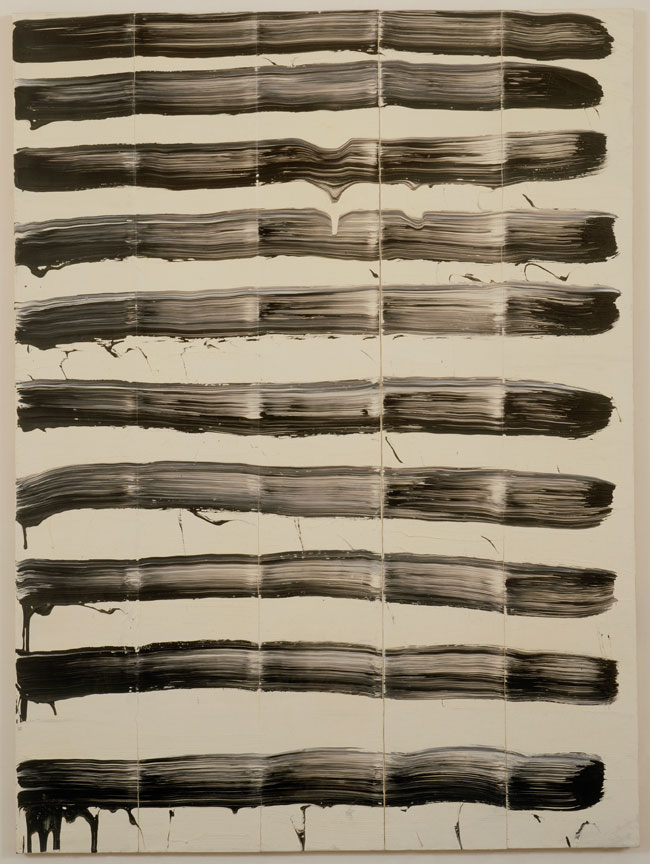
Painting #90 by David Reed, 1975. Collection of the Guggenheim Museum, New York City.

David Reed’s works of art are included in numerous private and public collections around the world, including the Albright-Knox Art Gallery in Buffalo, New York, Birmingham Museum of Art in Birmingham, Alabama, the Blanton Museum of Art of the University of Texas at Austin in Austin, Texas, Centre Georges Pompidou in Paris, Chase Manhattan Bank in New York City, Cincinnati Art Museum in Ohio, Corcoran Gallery of Art in Washington, D.C., Daros Collection in Zürich, Diözesanmuseum in Freising, Fonds National d'Art Contemporain in Paris, Fonds Régional d'Art Contemporain Auvergne in France, General Mills in Golden Valley, Minnesota, Hirshhorn Museum and Sculpture Garden in Washington, D.C., Kaiser Wilhelm Museum in Krefeld, Kunstmuseum St. Gallen in St. Gallen, Kunst Museum Winterthur in Switzerland, Kunstmuseum Liechtenstein in Vaduz, Louisiana Museum of Modern Art in Humlebæk, Denmark, the Maslow Collection in Shavertown, Pennsylvania, Minneapolis Institute of Art, in Minneapolis, Minnesota, Museum für Moderne Kunst in Frankfurt am Main, MUMOK in Vienna, Museum of Contemporary Art San Diego in San Diego, the Metropolitan Museum of Art in New York City, the North Carolina Museum of Art in Raleigh, North Carolina, Neues Museum Nürnberg in Nuremberg, Reed College in Portland, Oregon, Rose Art Museum of Brandeis University in Waltham, Massachusetts, Roswell Museum and Art Center in Roswell, New Mexico, Goetz Collection in Munich, Tel Aviv Museum of Art in Tel Aviv, Ulrich Museum of Art of Wichita State University in Wichita, Kansas, Virginia Museum of Fine Arts in Richmond, Virginia, and Weatherspoon Art Gallery of University of North Carolina at Greensboro in Greensboro, North Carolina.

== Publications ==
- David Reed is featured in Tony Godfrey's overview of painting of the last 40 years, “Painting Today.”
- Kienbaum Artists' Books published 24 working drawings by Reed in “Rock Paper Scissors.”
- David Reed: You Look Good in Blue (Verlag Fur Moderne Kunst, 2005)
- Heart of Glass (Snoeck Verlagsgesellschaft mbH, 2012)
