= Sandor Vago =

American painter

Sandor Vago (1887–1946) was a Hungarian-American painter.

== Biography ==
He was born in Hungary. After studying art in Budapest, Hungary, he completed his studies in Munich, Germany. Before World War I, the painter exhibited his artworks in Hungary as well as in other European countries, including Vienna, Austria and Venice, Italy. In 1921 he immigrated to the US and established his workshop in Cleveland, Ohio. There, he became a member of the local Society of Artists. Initially a painter of still lifes and landscapes, Vago became a successful portrait painter after his move to the US, receiving orders from private collectors and public institutions including the City of Cleveland. Vago taught at the Cleveland Institute of Art from 1929 to 1935.

He became a core member of the Cleveland School, a flourishing community started by artists exhibiting and working in the Cleveland area.

Sandor Vago died in 1946.

== Salons ==
- Cleveland Museum of Art May Show, 1922 to 1947
- Cleveland Society of Artists

== Artworks in public collections ==
- Portrait of John G. White, 100x130cm, Art collection, The Cleveland Public Library
- Flower still-life, 1924, 66x86cm, oil on canvas, Cleveland Museum of Art
- Self-Portrait, 1937, 93x103cm, oil on canvas, Cleveland Museum of Art

== Sources ==
- Akoun 2004, la Cote de l'Amateur publishing
