= Frederick Gottwald =

Austrian-American painter

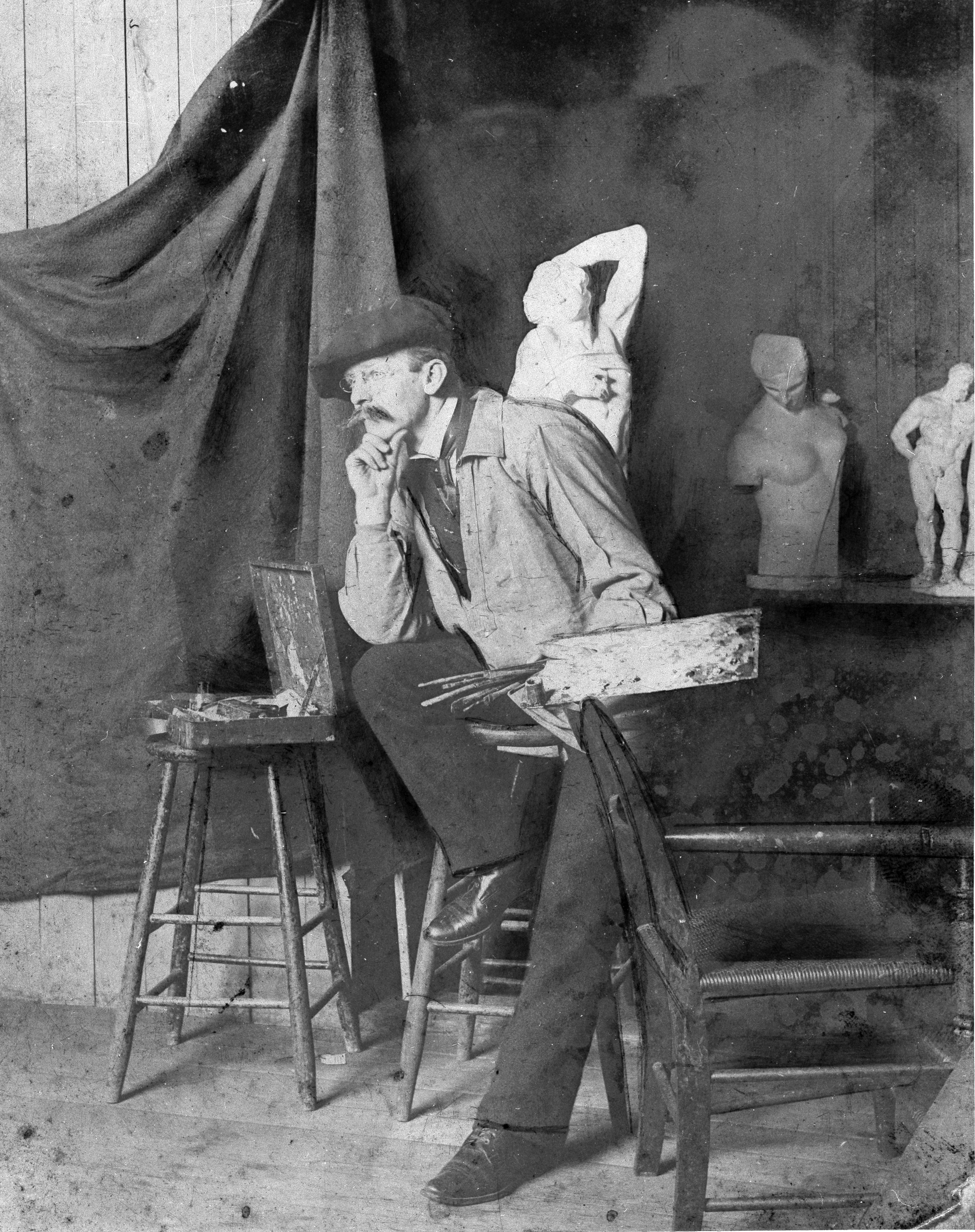
- Born: Frederick Carl Gottwald; August 15, 1858; Austrian Empire
- Died: June 23, 1941 (aged 82); Pasadena, California, U.S.
- Education: Art Students League of New York; Royal Academy (Munich); Académie Julian (Paris); Cooper Union (New York)
- Known for: Painting
- Movement: Cleveland School

Frederick Carl Gottwald (August 15, 1858 – June 23, 1941) was a traditionalist American painter who was influential in the development of the Cleveland School of art, sometimes called the "dean of Cleveland painters". He taught at the Western Reserve School of Design for Women (later renamed to the Cleveland Institute of Art), and it has been said that he "contributed more than any other person to Cleveland's artistic development".

== Life and career ==
Gottwald was born in the Austrian Empire, to Frederick and Caroline Grosse Gottwald, and emigrated to Cleveland, Ohio, as an infant. He first studied painting with Archibald Willard in 1874, with whom he would found the Cleveland Art Club in 1876. He then moved to New York City to continue his training at the Art Students League of New York, followed by stints at the Royal Academy in Munich, the Académie Julian in Paris, and Cooper Union back in New York. Upon his return to Cleveland in September 1885, he joined the faculty of the design school and would be associated with them for the next 41 years, including serving as director from 1889–1891. His directorship was ended by a demotion to "headmaster" and there was such bad feeling between him and his replacement, Newton A. Wells, that the two men ended up in a fistfight. Although Gottwald was allowed to remain at the school as an instructor, he never regained the position of director. As an instructor, he taught a large number of Cleveland-based artists, such as Charles Burchfield, Henry Keller, Abel Warshawsky, and Frank N. Wilcox.

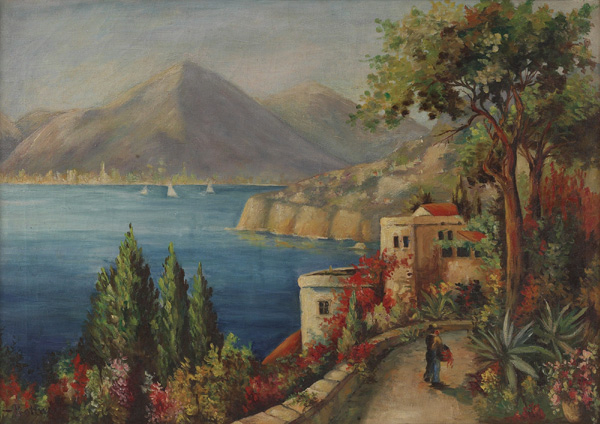
Italian Landscape, ca. 1920, oil on canvas

The 1890s were Gottwald's most successful years as an artist. During this period he exhibited almost yearly at the National Academy of Design, and the Boston Art Club a few times. He also had two pieces at the 1893 World's Columbian Exposition in Chicago, Illinois. In 1897, he founded a summer art school in Zoar which relocated to Chagrin Falls in 1899.

After his retirement from the school in 1926, he and his wife Myria Scott moved to Italy. They lived there for several years, returning to Cleveland in 1930, after which they retired to Pasadena, California in 1932. Gottwald died there in 1941.
