= Grace Kelly (disambiguation) =

Grace Kelly (1929–1982) was an American actress and the consort of Rainier III, Prince of Monaco.

Grace Kelly may also refer to:

- Grace V. Kelly (1877–1950), American artist
- Grace Kelly (1880–1956), eponym of the Grace post office in Grays Fork, Kentucky, United States
- Grace Kelly (musician) (born 1992), American musician
- Grace Kelly (footballer) (born 1994), Australian footballer
- Grace Kelly (film), a 1983 American film
- "Grace Kelly" (song), a 2007 song by Mika

== See also ==
- Grace of Monaco (film), a 2014 film on Grace Kelly
- Grace (disambiguation)
- Kelly (disambiguation)
