= Blasey =

Blasey is an English surname. Notable people with the surname include:

- Christine Blasey, American professor of psychology
- Scott Blasey, American rock musician

== See also ==
- Lawrence Edwin Blazey (1902–1999), American artist
