= Snowball's Chance =

Book by John Reed

- Author: John Reed
- Language: English
- Genre: Parody
- Publisher: Roof Books
- Publication date: 2002
- Publication place: United States
- Media type: Print (hardback & paperback) & E-book
- Pages: c.137 pp (May change depending on the publisher and the size of the text)

Snowball's Chance is a parody and unofficial sequel to George Orwell's Animal Farm written by John Reed, in which Snowball the pig returns to the Manor Farm after many years' absence, to install capitalism — which proves to have its own pitfalls.

== Background ==
Of Snowball's Chance as a follow-up to Orwell's work, Reed stated: "My intention is to blast Orwell, I’m really doing my best to annihilate him."

The title raised the ire of Christopher Hitchens. A New York Times article about a hostile letter sent to the publisher from the Orwell estate, which cited issues of copyright infringement, precipitated a journalistic and online debate about the book at a time when Orwell's legacy was under question, due to a list of "crypto-Communists" he handed over to the British Foreign Office. Orwell's literary executor also objected to the work. Hitchens accused Reed of being a "Bin Ladenist." As was reported in Australian paper The Age:

"[William] Hamilton [Orwell's literary executor], of London, said: 'If it were a straight parody, I would say 'Good on you.' But this book seems to take rather than give." Reed said: 'I think that Orwell, were he still alive, would far rather be with me in my hovel than sitting in some corporate office preparing lawsuits.'"

== Plot ==
The story begins with the death of Napoleon, the original antagonist of Animal Farm. The animals of the farm, fearing what will become of them, learn that Snowball is alive and well, and Snowball returns to the farm to encourage capitalism.

A second windmill is soon built alongside the first, and the two are thenceforth known as the Twin Mills (allegorical of the Twin Towers of the World Trade Center), and the animals all learn to walk on their hind legs, something hitherto forbidden by Old Major shortly before the expulsion of Mr. Jones from the farm. Also, in place of the original Seven Commandments, Snowball adopts a single slogan for the animals to live by: All animals are born equal - what they become is their own affair.

As time passes, the animals, under the leadership of Snowball, realise the properties of monetary gain, and begin to file lawsuits against neighbouring farms, allowing Animal Farm to gain land and wealth. The revitalised farm also attracts animals from elsewhere in England, who are segregated from the farm animals (a possible allegory for American racial segregation).

In an effort to increase their wealth, Snowball proposes to transform the farm into a large fairground named Animal Fair (similar to the development of Coney Island in the 19th century), and in order to provide power for the fair, the animals drive off a group of beavers and other woodland creatures living by a nearby river, and the beaver-dams are destroyed in order for the farm to exploit the water-supply of the river (similar treatment to that endured by the Native Americans).

Despite the success of Animal Fair, the excessive littering and pollution leaves the farm in a deplorable state, and matters worsen when the Twin Mills are destroyed by the woodland creatures in retaliation for their expulsion from the riverbank (in a manner similar to the 9/11 attack on the World Trade Center). Snowball counteracts this by declaring war on the now-fanatical woodland creatures, even though Animal Farm is in no position to win the war.

== Differences from Animal Farm ==
- Snowball - in Animal Farm an allegory of Leon Trotsky; in Snowball's Chance he becomes a hyper-capitalist.
- Sugarcandy Mountain - the likely allegory for Heaven mentioned by Moses the Raven in Animal Farm. In Snowball's Chance it is renamed the Sugarcandy Lodestar.
- The language of Snowball's Chance is more over-the-top than that of Animal Farm. As John Strausbaugh noted in the New York Press: "He not only shanghais Orwell’s story, but amps up and mocks the writer’s famously flat, didactic style."
