= Lilly Library =

Library of Indiana University Bloomington in Bloomington, Indiana, US

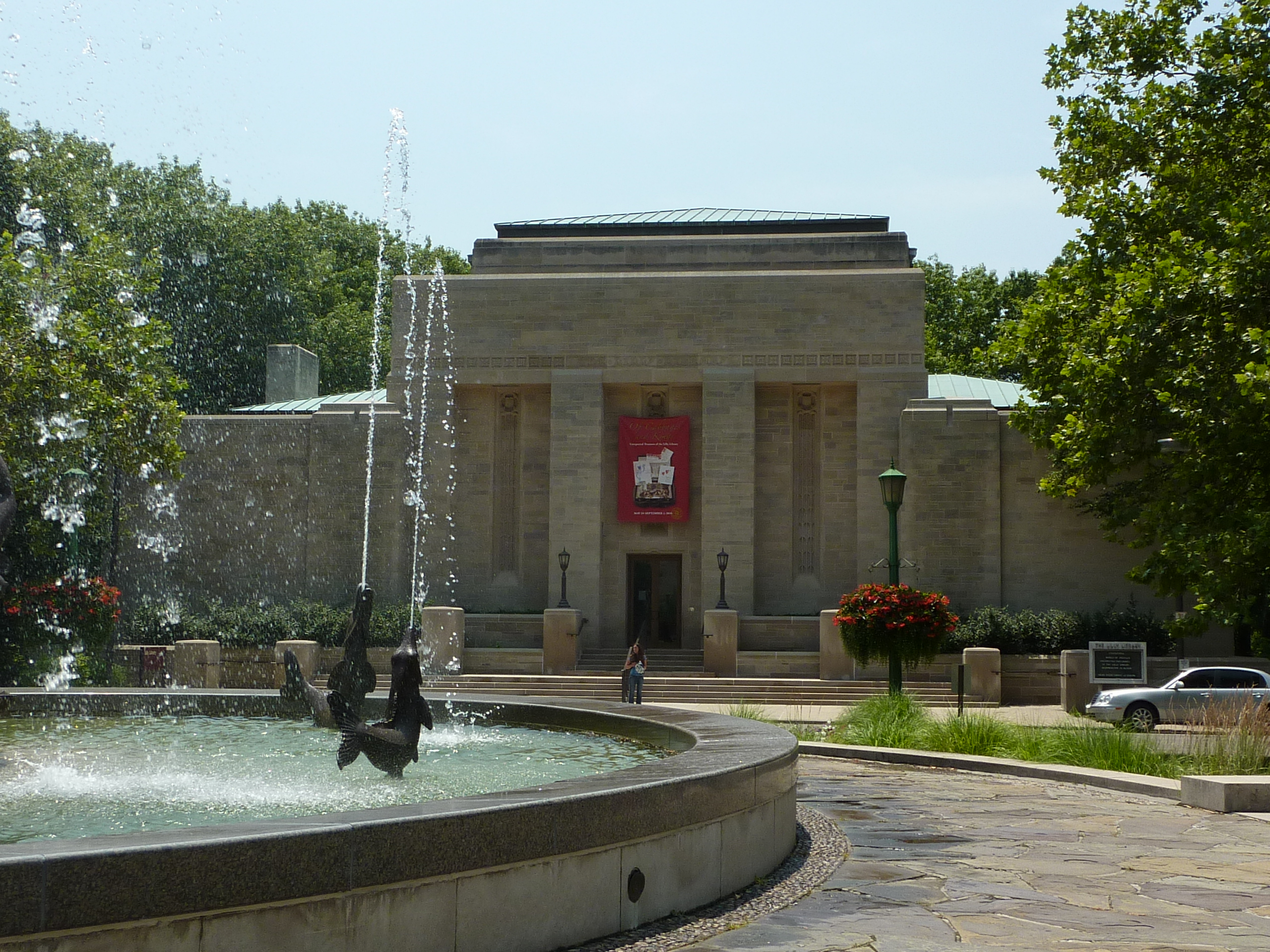
- 39°10′04″N 86°31′08″W
- Location: Bloomington, Indiana, U.S.
- Established: 1960; 66 years ago

Collection
- Size: Approximately 450,000 books, 8.5 million manuscripts, 60,000 comic books, 16,000 mini books, 35,000 puzzles, and 150,000 pieces of sheet music.

Access and use
- Circulation: Library does not publicly circulate
- Population served: 48,514 faculty, staff, and students at Indiana University Bloomington, additional scholars, and members of the public

Other information
- Director: Joel Silver
- Employees: 20
- Website: libraries.indiana.edu/lilly-library

The Lilly Library, located on the campus of Indiana University Bloomington in Bloomington, Indiana, United States, is a rare book and manuscript library in the United States. At its dedication on October 3, 1960, the library contained a collection of 20,000 books, 17,000 manuscripts, more than fifty oil paintings, and 300 prints. Currently, the Lilly Library has 8.5 million manuscripts, 450,000 books, 60,000 comic books, 16,000 mini books, 35,000 puzzles, and 150,000 sheets of music.

== History ==
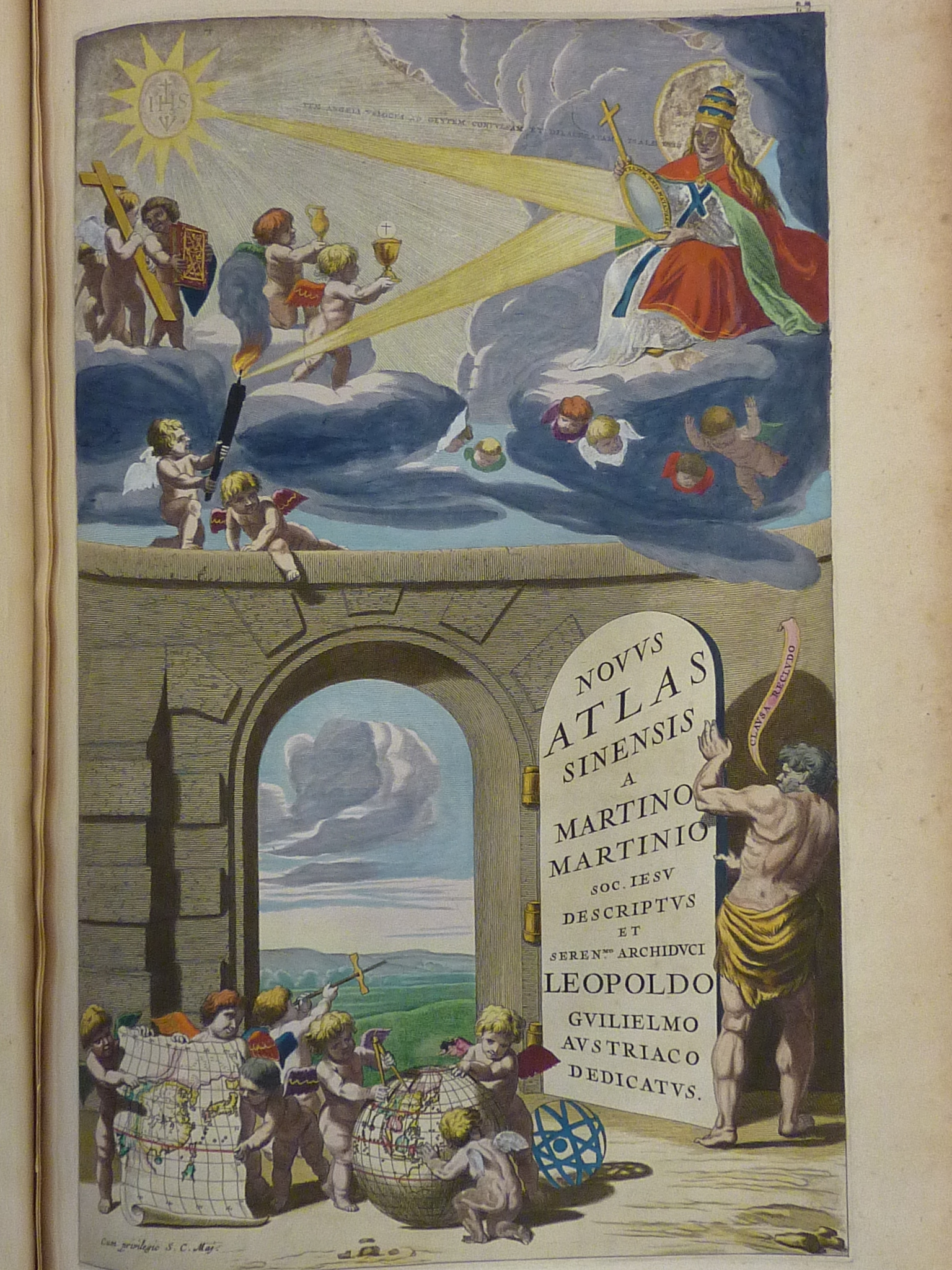
Novus Atlas Sinensis by Martino Martini from the collection of Lilly Library

The Lilly Library was founded in 1960 with the collection of Josiah K. Lilly Jr., owner of Lilly Pharmaceuticals in Indianapolis. J.K. Lilly was a collector most of his life. From the mid-1920s until his death, he devoted a great deal of his leisure time to building his collections of books and manuscripts, works of art, coins, stamps, military miniatures, firearms and edged weapons, and nautical models. J. K. Lilly's collections of books and manuscripts, totaling more than 20,000 books and 17,000 manuscripts, together with more than fifty oil paintings and 300 prints, were given by the collector to Indiana University between 1954 and 1957. These materials form the foundation of the rare book and manuscript collections of the Lilly Library.

The extent to which J. K. Lilly realized his collecting goals was summed up by Frederick B. Adams Jr., at the dedication of the Lilly Library on October 3, 1960: "Mr. Lilly's books cover so many fields that it is difficult to believe that any one man's enthusiasm could encompass them all. It is equally astounding that he was able to acquire so many books of such scarcity and quality in the short space of 30 years. Money alone isn't the answer; diligence, courage, and imagination were also essential. The famous books in English and American literature, the books most influential in American life, the great works in the history of science and ideas--all these are among the 20,000 Lilly books in this building."

== Collection ==
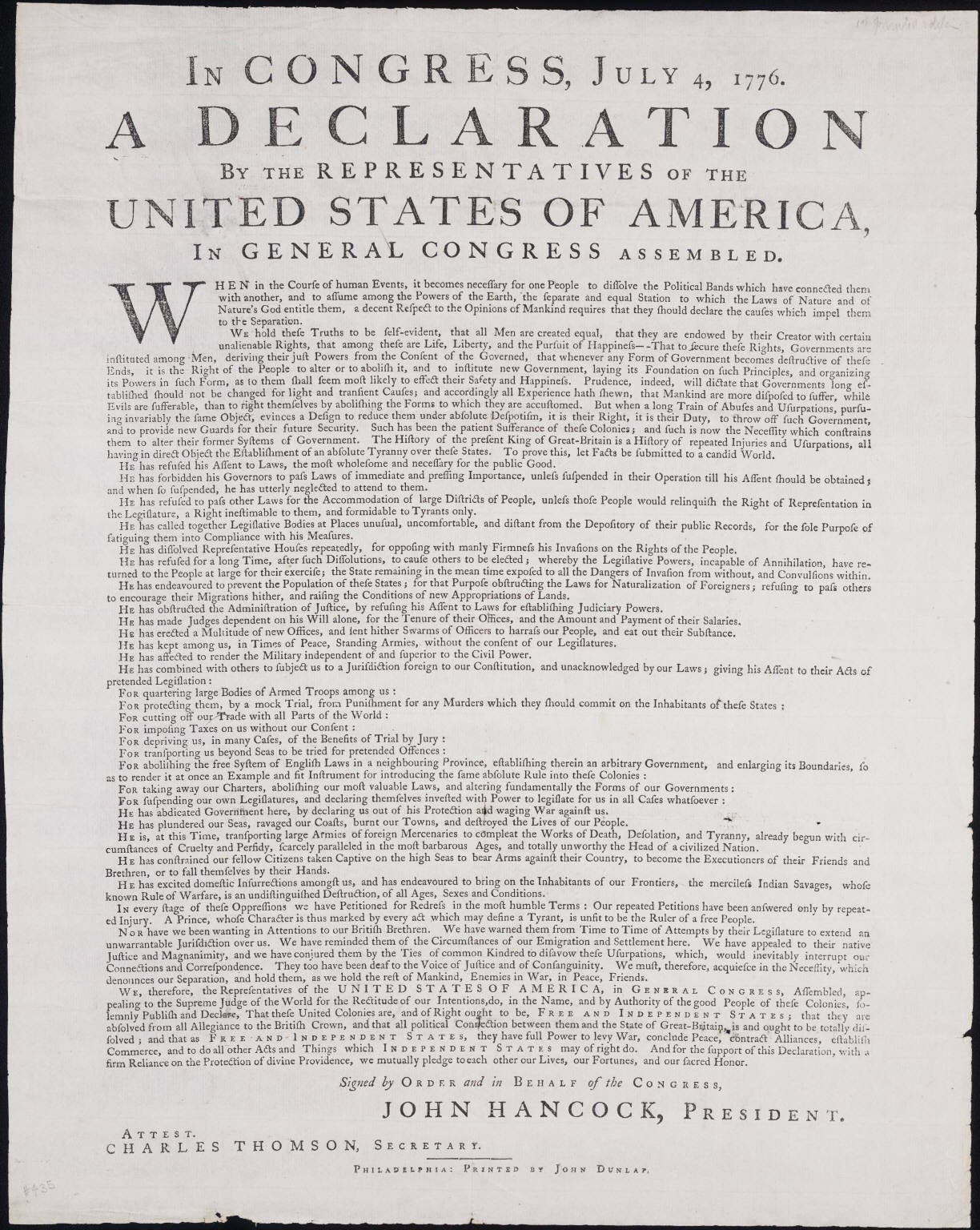
Yale University's copy of the Dunlap broadside

The library now contains approximately 450,000 books, 8.5 million manuscripts, 60,000 comic books, 16,000 mini books, 35,000 puzzles, and 150,000 pieces of sheet music.

The library's holdings are particularly strong in British and American history and literature, Latin Americana, medicine and science, food and drink, children's literature, fine printing and binding, popular music, medieval and Renaissance manuscripts, and early printing. There are many notable items in the library's collections.

- New Testament of the Gutenberg Bible
- The first printed collection of Shakespeare's works (the First Folio)
- Audubon's Birds of America
- One of 26 extant copies of the "First Printing of the Declaration of Independence" (also known as the "Dunlap Broadside") that was printed in Philadelphia on July 4, 1776
- George Washington's letter accepting the presidency of the United States
- Abraham Lincoln's desk from his law office and a leaf from the famous Abraham Lincoln "Sum Book" ca. 1824–1826
- Lord Chesterfield's letters to his son
- The manuscripts of Robert Burns's "Auld Lang Syne"
- The Boxer Codex, manuscript written c. 1595 which contains illustrations of ethnic groups in the Philippines at the time of their initial contact with the Spaniards.
- J. M. Synge's "The Playboy of the Western World"
- J. M. Barrie's "Peter Pan"
- Typescripts of many of Ian Fleming's James Bond novels
- Personal papers, letters and manuscripts of Hunter S. Thompson
- Two locks of Edgar Allan Poe's hair, one sent by Poe in a letter to Sarah Helen Whitman, and the other cut on his deathbed

The library also owns the papers of Hollywood directors Orson Welles and John Ford, film critic Pauline Kael, the poets Sylvia Plath and Ezra Pound, and authors Edith Wharton and Upton Sinclair.

=== Ruth E. Adomeit collection ===
After the death of Ruth E. Adomeit in 1996, her collection of miniature books was donated to the Lilly. The Adomeit collection is considered to be one of the largest collections of miniature books. The collection is titled 4000 Years of Miniature Books.

The Adomeit collection ranges the entire history of human record keeping in miniature form, from cuneiform tablets of circa 2000 B.C. to contemporary small press and artists' books.

=== Michael E. Uslan Collection ===
Michael Uslan, producer of the Batman movies, donated over 30,000 comics to the Lilly Library. Parts of the collection were displayed at the Lilly Library in an exhibition called "Comics as Cultural Mythology: The Michael E. Uslan Collection of Comic Books and Graphic Novels" from September 12, 2005, to December 17, 2005.

The Uslan Collection also contains a vast array of action figures as well as other pop culture memorabilia, which can be accessed through the Lilly Library Request System.

The collection is currently housed at the Auxiliary Library Facility (ALF) and can be accessed for use through IUCAT, the Indiana University Library catalog.

=== Jerry Slocum Mechanical Puzzle Collection ===
In 2006, the library received a collection of 30,000 mechanical puzzles and 4,000 puzzle related books from Jerry Slocum. The collection is the largest assemblage of its kind in the world. Mechanical puzzles are hand-held objects that must be manipulated to solve the puzzle. The collection spans multiple centuries and five continents.

The collection is on permanent display in the Slocum Puzzle Room and includes puzzles that can be handled by visitors. The Lilly Library is currently developing an online database of the collection.

=== French Revolution documents ===
The Lilly contains an extensive collection of material that centers on the French Revolution of 1789. The collection contains approximately seven thousand pieces and includes all types of printed materials, such as journals, polemical pamphlets, and many other documents. The collection consists of 3,362 legal publications. The majority of the other documents are royal and administrative acts published in pamphlet form between 1789 and 1799. There are royal edicts, arrets, addresses, declarations, reglements, lettres patentes, rapports, ordonnances, memoires, lois, and various other titled or untitled official documents.

=== Bernardo Mendel Collection ===
The Mendel collection is divided into two categories: one relates to the period of geographical discovery and exploration and the other consists of additions made by the Lilly Library after the original acquisition. The geographical and discovery collection ranges from the 15th through the 19th century. It includes the great cosmographic and geographic works of Ptolemy as well as narratives of the discovery and conquest of the New World. The emphasis of the subsequent acquisitions is on Latin Americana from the 17th through the 19th century, with particular attention to Mexican history.

The Mendel Room in the Lilly was dedicated in 1964.

=== James Whitcomb Riley Collection ===
The Lilly Library has the personal papers of James Whitcomb Riley in a variety of manuscript collections. There are also miscellaneous uncataloged materials that includes clippings, scrapbooks, photographs, memorabilia, and other ephemera. The majority of his writings and personal correspondence are found in the Riley manuscripts. Hundreds of Riley's books are listed in Indiana University's online catalog. On the 150th anniversary of his birth, the library produced an online exhibition that explores James Whitcomb Riley's impact on American society and the 19th century literary world.

The Lilly Library has other Indiana authors in their collection as well.

=== Film, Radio & Television Collection ===
The Lilly Library houses 2,000 motion picture scripts, including the second draft script for the film Chariots of Fire. In order to supplement the script material the library added to the collection material from Orson Welles, John Ford, Clifford Odets, and most recently Peter Bogdanovich. The library is home to 800 BBC radio scripts and the papers of Lance Sieveking and D. G. Bridson. The television scripts consist mostly of material from John McGreevey as well as scripts from such television shows as Star Trek and Mission: Impossible.

- The John Ford Collection includes four of his Oscars - one which is on display - stills from Ben-Hur (1925), script drafts, and correspondence.

=== Sheet music ===
The library houses 150,000 pieces of sheet music. The prominent collections are the Sam DeVincent Collection of American Sheet Music, the Starr Sheet Music Collection, and the Wildermuth Collection of Hoagy Carmichael Sheet Music.

=== Dale Messick Collection ===
The library has the original pen and ink drawings from Dale Messick's comic Brenda Starr. The collection is organized and searchable by date.

=== Mystery Writers of America Collection ===
The material is made up of papers relating to meetings, correspondence, drafts, conferences, periodicals and books from the Mystery Writers of America association.

=== Plath Manuscript Collection ===
The library has 94 poems as well as 3,324 examples of correspondence, writing, and memorabilia from Sylvia Plath. The poems are arranged in chronological order and the miscellaneous items are organized by type. 150 books from Plath's only library are housed at the Lilly Library as well.

== Other collections ==
- American animator Willis Pyle, known for his work on Pinocchio and Mr. Magoo, donated his personal archives and papers to the Lilly Library.
- Peter and Iona Opie donated their collection of approximately 1,200 children's books to the Lilly. Peter and Iona Opie are the authors of The Oxford Dictionary of Nursery Rhymes (1952) and The Lore and Language of Schoolchildren (1959).
- The Gosling Mandrovsky Playing Card Collection
- Richard Hughes, author of A High Wind in Jamaica.
- 398 books and periodicals from the collection of Elizabeth Gamble Miller
- Most of the papers of the Scottish author, critic and journalist Richard Curle

== Library location ==
The Lilly Library is located on the southern side of a small square in the heart of the Indiana University Bloomington campus. Showalter Fountain is in the middle of the square. Indiana University Art Museum and Indiana University School of Fine Arts are on the opposite (northern) side of the square. Indiana University Auditorium is on the square's eastern side.

== See also ==
- David A. Randall
