= Adomaitis =

Adomaitis is the masculine form of a Lithuanian family name. It means "son of Adomas (Adam)". Its feminine forms are: Adomaitienė (married woman or widow) and Adomaitytė (unmarried woman).

The surname may refer to:

- Dainius Adomaitis (born 1974), Lithuanian basketball player and coach
- Juozas Adomaitis-Šernas (1859–1922), Lithuanian scientific writer
- Linas Adomaitis (born 1976), Lithuanian musician
- Regimantas Adomaitis (1937–2022), Lithuanian movie and stage actor

== See also ==
- Adomeit
- Adomitis
