= William Sommer =

American painter (1867–1949)

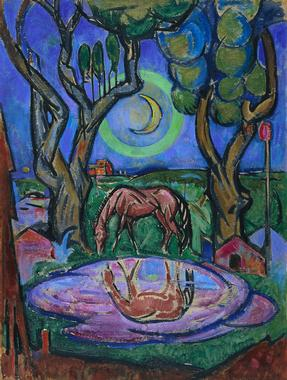
The Pool (1918). In the collection of the Cleveland Museum of Art.

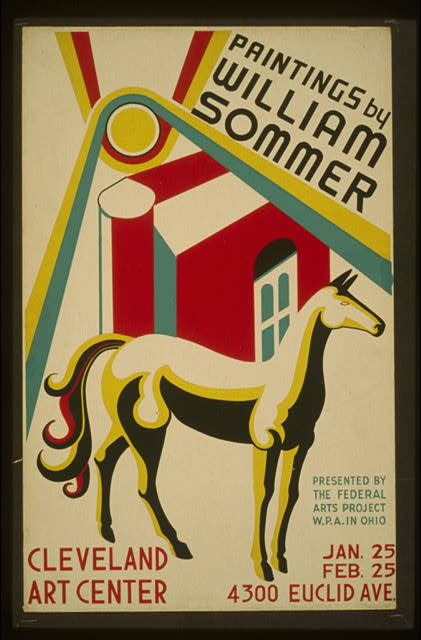
Sommer paintings exhibit poster, Cleveland, 1938

William Sommer (1867–1949) was an American Modernist painter.

William Sommer was born in Detroit, Michigan in 1867. He was largely self-taught, but received instruction early on from artist and commercial lithographer Julius Melchers. He apprenticed with the Detroit Calvert Lithograph Company for seven years but in 1890 he traveled to Europe where he trained with Professors Johann Herterich, Ludwig Schmid, and Adolph Menzel. In 1907 he accepted a position with the Otis Lithograph Company of Cleveland, Ohio and in 1911 he co-founded the Kokoon Arts Club to promote modern art in Cleveland. In 1914 he relocated to Brandywine, Ohio. He worked on several large-scale murals for the Federal Art Project, including Rural Homestead in the Geneva, Ohio post office.

== Chronology ==
- 1878-1883: Studies with Julius Melchers
- 1881-1888: Works as lithographic apprentice in Detroit for Calvert Lithograph Co.
- 1888-1907: Works as lithographic journeyman in Boston, England, Munich, and NYC; Sommer studied fine art in Munich for a year in 1890, then returned to New York City and married. Sommer continued to work as lithographer and privately concentrated on his own art.
- 1892: Sommer joins NYC's bohemian artists' group known as the Kit Kat Klub.
- 1907: Sommer moves his wife and children to Cleveland where he worked for Otis Lithograph Co.; the Sommer family ultimately settled in Brandywine, Ohio (today Northfield). Sommer remained there, working in Cleveland and painting in watercolors and oils at home and on outdoor junkets.
- 1912- : Sommer co-founds Cleveland's bohemian artists' group known as the Kokoon Arts Club; exhibits in the 1913 Taylor Show, Cleveland's response to the Armory Show in NYC; frequents the Laukhuff Bookstore with other members of the Kokoon Club; this club was known for its evening activities of "painting, talking, reading and--not infrequently--drinking. . . .the Kokoon Club would still be honored today as the home-away-from-home of William Sommer."
- 1929: Sommer loses his job as a lithographer to the new offset printing process
- 1933: Sommer exhibits at the Whitney Biennial and the Museum of Modern Art, both in NYC; paints mural for the Cleveland Public Hall as part of the Public Works of Art Project
- 1934: Sommer paints a mural for the Cleveland Public Library
- 1937-1949: Sommer receives numerous exhibitions and one-artist shows in NYC, Cleveland, Cincinnati, Youngstown, Oberlin, and Akron

Artist William Sommer spent most of his life in Summit County near Brandywine Falls. Sommer was an acknowledged leader of the "Cleveland School," a group of Cleveland-based artists who were active from the teens through the mid-1940s. These artists formed the core of an art community whose size and activity paralleled the growth and energy of Cleveland during that period. Sommer painted from the turn of the 20th century into the 1940s, absorbing the ideas of the Cubists and other adventurous artists of that time and integrating these concepts and techniques into his own work. His subjects were thoroughly rooted in the American midwest, however; favorite subjects included young children and farm scenes.

He continued to paint until his death in 1949. Hart Crane dedicated his 1927 poem Sunday Morning Apples to Sommer.
