= John Reed (novelist) =

American novelist

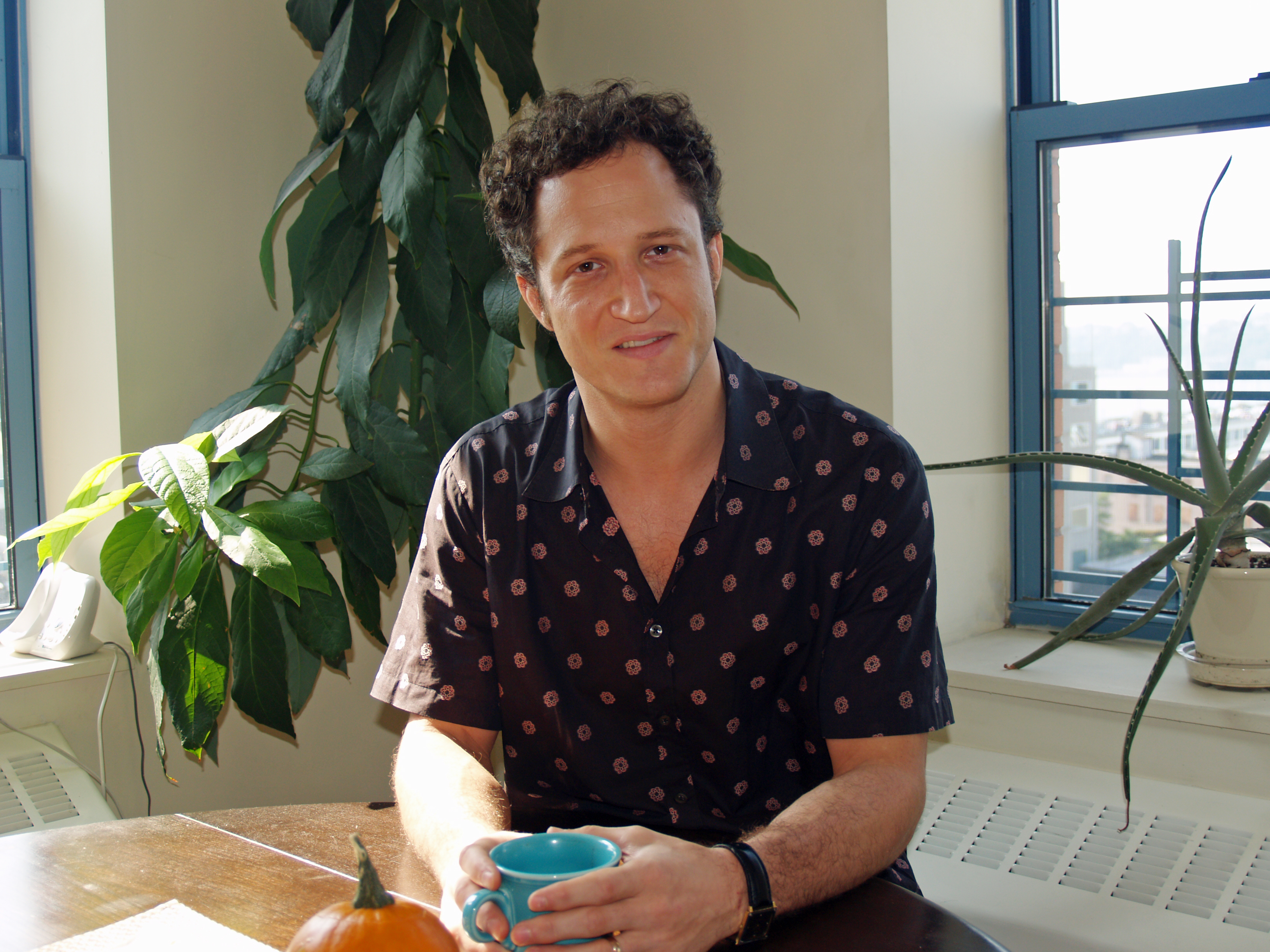
- Reed in 2007
- Born: February 7, 1969 (age 57); New York City, U.S.
- Education: Hampshire College (BA); Columbia University (MFA)
- Occupation: Novelist
- Website: www.easyreeder.com

John Reed (born February 7, 1969) is an American novelist. He is the author of four novels: A Still Small Voice (2000), Snowball's Chance (2002) with a preface by Alexander Cockburn, The Whole (2005), and All the World's a Grave: A New Play by William Shakespeare (2008). His fifth book, Tales of Woe (2010), is a collection of twenty-five stories, chronicling true stories of abject misery.

== Biography ==
Born in 1969 in New York City, Reed is the son of artists David Reed and Judy Rifka. He attended Hampshire College, and received a Masters in Fine Art in Creative Writing from Columbia University. He teaches at The New School.

Reed was an early contributor to, and subsequently an editor with, Open City, a New York literary journal published by Robert Bingham, who later founded the book series.

== Works ==
He is affiliated with the New York Press and The Brooklyn Rail. "Americans are extremely sophisticated in terms of narrative forms," said Reed in an interview. "We see it in commercials, we see it on TV, we see it in movies. But the narrative forms we're talking about are three acts, five acts, depending on how you want to look at it. They're all based on a Christian model of sin, suffering, redemption; which is not a large model."

=== A Still Small Voice ===
A Still Small Voice (Delacorte 2000, Delta 2001), Reed's first novel, is a historical novel based on the life of a girl growing up in Kentucky from 1850 to 1870.

=== Snowball's Chance ===
Snowball's Chance (Roof Books 2002/2003), Reed's second novel was a controversial send-up of George Orwell's Animal Farm, and ended in a cataclysmic attack on the "Twin Mills" (reminiscent of the 9/11 attack on the World Trade Center). It became a bestseller in the field of books by independent literary publishers.

=== The Whole, or, Duh Whole ===
John Reed discusses politics after 9/11 and Reed's take on Orwell's neoconservativism.

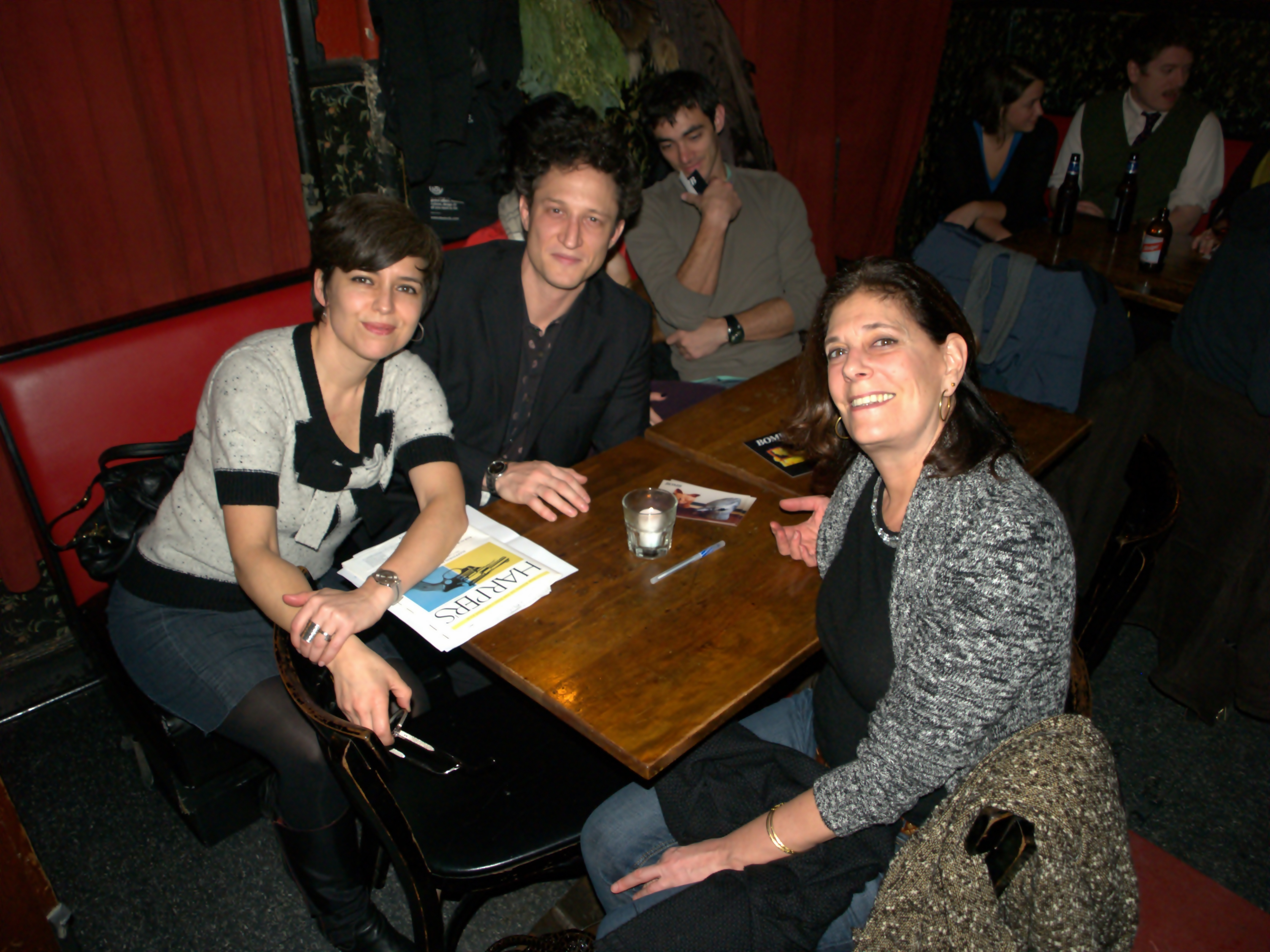
Reed between BOMB magazine's senior editor Monica de la Torre and editor-in-chief Betsy Sussler.

The Whole, Reed's third novel, parodied MTV and was released in 2005 by MTV Books (Simon & Schuster). The novel described a gigantic hole that appears in the middle of the country, which engulfs four states.
