= Kokoon Arts Club =

August Biehle, Kokoon Club Ball, Private Collection

The Kokoon Arts Club, sometimes spelled Kokoon Arts Klub, was a Bohemian artists group founded in 1911 by Carl Moellman, William Sommer and Elmer Brubeck to promote Modernism in Cleveland, Ohio. Moellman had been a member of New York City's Kit Kat Club, which served as inspiration for Kokoon. From 1913 to 1946 Kokoon's annual Bal-Masque balls scandalized Cleveland with risqué activities, provocative art, and nudity, and was sometimes humorously referred to as the "Cocaine Club". A fierce rivalry stood between Kokoon and the more conservative Cleveland Society of Artists.

== See also ==
- Cleveland School
- Cleveland Artists Foundation
