= László Dús =

American artist

- Born: July 14, 1939 (age 86); Zalaegerszeg, Hungary
- Known for: Printmaking; Painting
- Notable work: Cavern Opening [Triptych], various print cycles
- Movement: Modern art Nonobjective art
- Patrons: National Gallery of Art Smithsonian American Art Museum; Renwick Gallery Albert Scaglione

László Dús (born 14 July 1941, Zalaegerszeg) is an Americanized Hungarian-born visual artist. Dús is known for nonobjective Modernist prints.

Several of his prints are in the permanent collections of the U.S. National Gallery of Art. Dús prints are also in the collections of the Renwick Gallery and the Smithsonian American Art Museum. Dús prints are also in the collection of the Utah Museum of Fine Arts.

Typical subject matter is a blocky geometric color field composition with some shapes having "torn" edges. Large-size prints are scarce. Park West Gallery leader Albert Scaglione (also specializing in Pablo Picasso and Pierre-Auguste Renoir), was a major booster of the artist.
