= Kálmán Kubinyi =

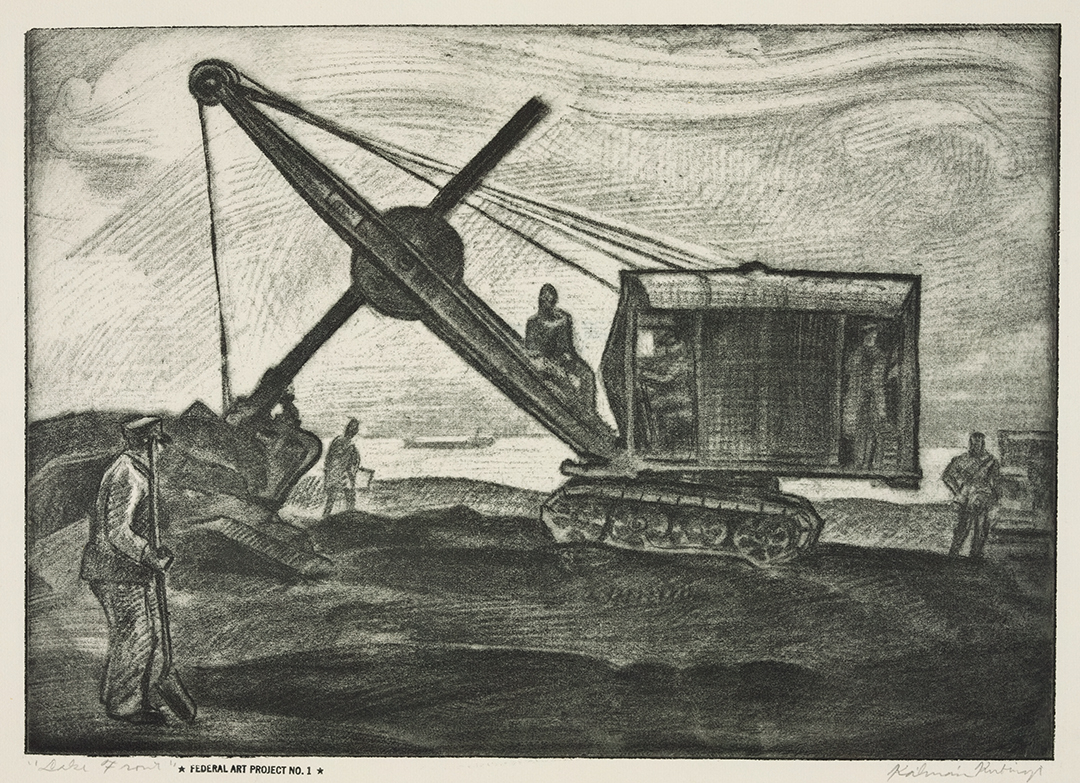
Lake Front, a 1935 etching by Kálmán Kubinyi

Kálmán Mátyás Béla Kubinyi (June 29, 1906 Cleveland – September 3, 1973 Stockbridge, Massachusetts) was an influential etcher, engraver and enamelist and a member of the so-called Cleveland School, a number of relatively prominent artists in Northeast Ohio that existed from about 1910 to 1960.

Kubinyi was a modernist whose interpretations of the machine age through "ash can" subjects and industrial scenes often bear the stamp of Social Realism. His work was widely exhibited throughout the 1930s, including at the Venice Biennale (1937) and the New York World's Fair (1939).

== Biography ==
As a child he attended art classes taught by William Zorach, later graduating from the Cleveland School of Art in 1926 and briefly engaging in further art studies in Munich.

Kubinyi supervised the graphic arts division of the Works Progress Administration in Cleveland from 1935 until 1939, when the W.P.A. named him to head the entire Cleveland W.P.A. arts project. During the 1930s, Kubinyi reportedly engaged in politics as a member of the Communist Party USA, and taught printmaking at the Cleveland School of Art (now the Cleveland Institute of Art), the Cleveland Museum of Art and the John Huntington Polytechnic Institute.

Kubinyi founded the Cleveland Print Makers in 1930 and served as its president for 11 years. In 1932, the group established the "Print-a-Month" series, the first of its kind in visual art, and apparently modeled on the 1926 Book-of-the-Month Club. For an annual fee of $10, subscribers received a monthly etching, lithograph or woodcut. Artists obtained $50 for each commission, printed in signed editions limited to 250 impressions. Contributors included Emil Ganso, Yasuo Kuniyoshi, Rockwell Kent, Kubinyi and many others during the series' five-year life span. Considering inflation, the $50 commission fee in 1932 might be worth about $752 in 2007 according to one calculation.

Between 1930 and 1948 Kubinyi took top prizes on five occasions at the Cleveland Museum of Art's May Show, an annual event which helped to define the Cleveland School over much of its life. He exhibited at the show in various media over a nearly 30-year period, beginning in 1928.

At age the age of 27, Kubinyi married Doris Hall (1907–2000) a successful artist in her own right, who first trained as a painter with Charles Hawthorne in Provincetown, Massachusetts, and later at the Cleveland School of Art where she graduated in 1929. While studying in Cleveland, she met Kubinyi who was teaching printmaking. They later collaborated on a long and successful career in enameling beginning in the 1940s. The couple had two children. Their son, Laszlo Kubinyi became an illustrator as well. Their daughter, Moisha married the illustrator R.O. Blechman. His grand daughter Natalia Kubinyi also is an illustrator, who now goes by the name of Natalia Aura Tova Kadish.

Kubinyi reportedly once said of his collaboration with Hall, "Control of color, design and most of the application of the enamel is done by Doris. I beat out the large sculptural forms, the metal forming, fabrication, ground coats, compounding of enamels, spraying and burning of undercoats. I take the brunt of the preparation."

During the 1940s, Kubinyi and his wife opened a gallery and studio in Gloucester, Massachusetts. They later opened a studio/gallery in downtown Boston, and finally a studio in Stockbridge, where Kubinyi also directed the art department for Hans Maeder's Stockbridge School.

Today Kubinyi's work is found in various private collections and in several museums and other public venues, including the University of Michigan Museum of Art, the Kelvin Smith Library at Case Western Reserve University, the Western Reserve Historical Society and the Fine Arts Museum of San Francisco. Three 1957 enamel works depicting signs of the Zodiac, are installed on the exterior of Michigan State University's Brody Dormitories. These three works are primarily by Doris Hall, but with contributions from Kubinyi. As of 2009, the Brody works appeared to be in need of maintenance. The Goldsmith of Florence: A Book of Great Craftsmen and a few other volumes were illustrated by Kubinyi.

== See also ==
- Ashcan School
- Cleveland Artists Foundation
