= Paul Travis =

American artist

Paul Bough Travis
- Born: January 2, 1891; Wellsville, Ohio
- Died: November 23, 1975 (aged 84)
- Education: Cleveland School of Art, 1913-1917
- Known for: Painter, Etcher, Lithographer

Paul Bough Travis (January 2, 1891 – November 23, 1975) was an American artist of the Cleveland School.

== Life ==
=== Early life ===
Paul Bough Travis was born in Wellsville, Ohio on January 2, 1891, to Elizabeth Bough Travis and William Melancthon Travis. After graduating from the local high school when he was 21, Travis taught for a year at a one-room school in nearby Madison Township. When he was 22, declining an engineering scholarship from Washington & Jefferson College, he moved to Cleveland where he enrolled in the Cleveland School of Art (today known as the Cleveland Institute of Art). Travis studied there for five years, where he became a protégé of Henry Keller, and also encountered Charles Burchfield and Frank N. Wilcox, all of whom later became acknowledged members of the Cleveland School. Travis remained friends with Burchfield and Wilcox for the rest of his life.

After graduating in 1917 with a degree in illustration, Travis enlisted in the Army to fight in World War I. A few months later he was sent to France, to a base outside Le Mans, where he trained as a machine gunner. While he was in the process of being sent to the front one of his commanding officers, who had noted his artistic abilities and intelligence, transferred him to survey work. He spent most of the remainder of the war in Le Mans, but also traveled widely throughout France, painting and sketching. After the war he was appointed as an art teacher at the American Forces University of Beaune.

When he returned from France in 1920 he accepted a teaching position at the Cleveland School of Art, where he taught for 38 years. He also began submitting his artwork to the May Show, an annual exhibition of local artists sponsored by the Cleveland Museum of Art. He first submitted to the May Show in 1920, and the following year he won first prize for an etching of the Chartres Cathedral. By the end of his life, Travis had entered his artwork into 50 May Show exhibitions.

=== Trip to Africa ===
In 1928, at the age of 36, Travis used a sabbatical from teaching to take an eight-month trip to Africa. Travis's trip was sponsored by a number of Cleveland-area organizations, including The Gilpin Players of Karamu House, the African Art Sponsors, the Cleveland Museum of Natural History, and the Cleveland Museum of Art. Travis traveled roughly the same path as famed British explorer Henry Morton Stanley, from Cape Town, South Africa, to Cairo, Egypt. Along the way, Travis sketched, took film and photographs, and collected artifacts.

== Legacy ==
The artwork and artifacts Travis amassed during his 1928 trip through Africa went into the collections of the Cleveland Museum of Art, the Cleveland Museum of Natural History, and Karamu House. The Cleveland Museum of Art received works Travis collected from the Mangbetu people while in the northeastern part of Congo, and as of June 2010, the museum owns 71 pieces of art created by Travis himself. Some of Travis's diary entries, letters, and film footage have been stored in the Smithsonian's Archives of American Art. Dan Tranberg of the Cleveland Plain Dealer called Travis's work "some of the most historically significant art this city has ever produced." In 2001 the Cleveland Artists Foundation published a retrospective of Travis's work.
