= Hannes Adomeit =

German political scientist (1942–2022)

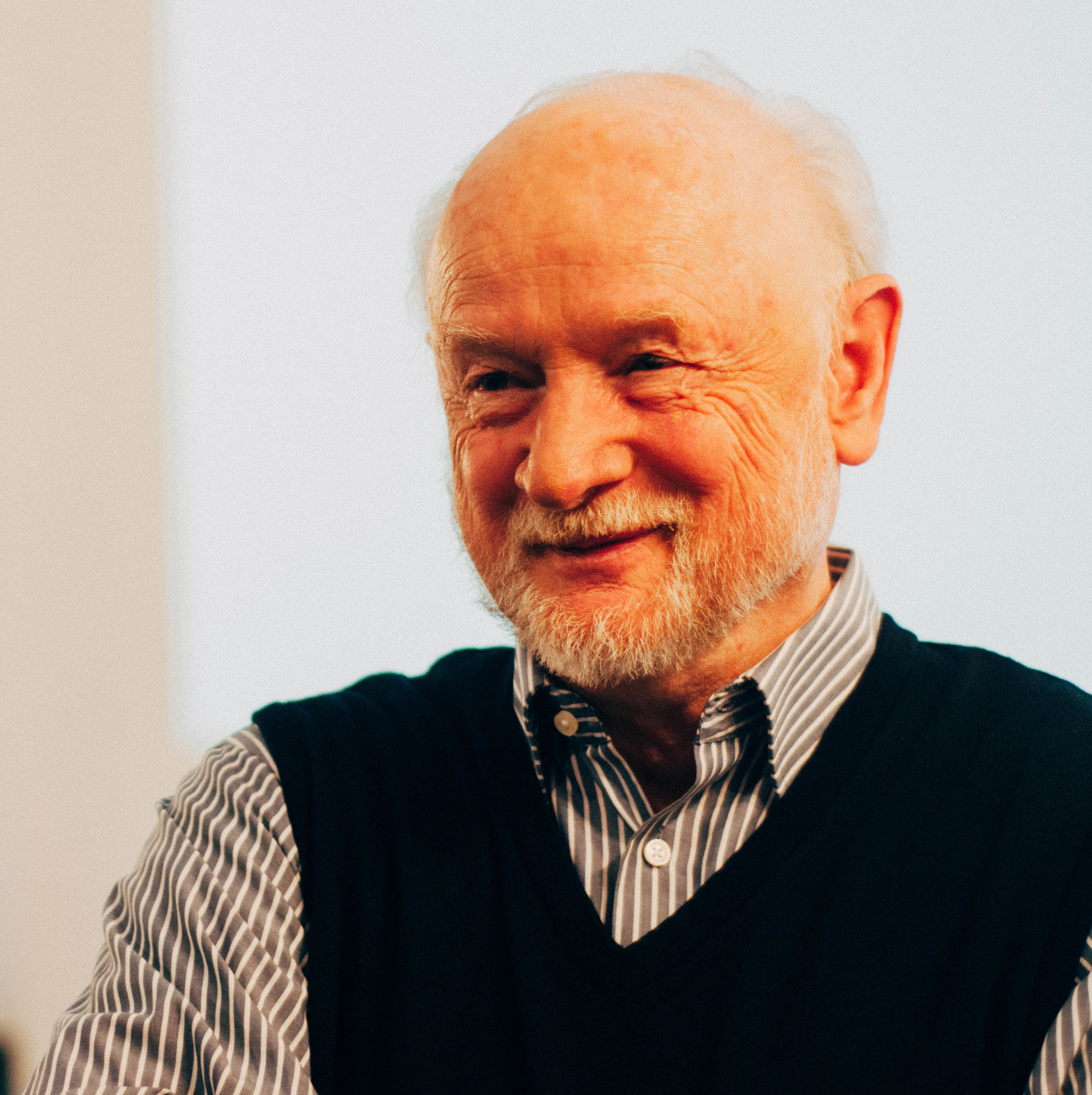
- Born: 9 November 1942; Memel, Gau East Prussia, Germany (now Klaipėda, Lithuania)
- Died: 25 April 2022 (aged 79); Berlin, Germany
- Education: Free University of Berlin; Otto-Suhr-Institut; Columbia University
- Occupations: Political scientist, analyst

Hannes Adomeit (9 November 1942 – 25 April 2022) was a German political scientist. He worked as a political analyst with emphasis on foreign policy, security and defense, transatlantic perspectives in Europe. He worked with the American Institute for Contemporary German Studies (AICGS) at Johns Hopkins University as well as Bosch Public Policy Fellow at the Transatlantic Academy in Washington, D.C., and "Non-Resident Fellow" at the Institute for Security Politics at the University of Kiel (ISPK). He studied at the Freie Universität Berlin and received his PhD from Columbia University in 1972. He served as an expert for Soviet studies in various British, German, Canadian, and American institutes like the RAND Corporation in Santa Monica. After 1989, he taught at The Fletcher School of Law and Diplomacy, run by Harvard and Tufts University, and in Warsaw's College of Europe.

Adomeit was born in Memel (today Klaipėda, Lithuania). He died on 25 April 2022 in Berlin, aged 79.

== Selected publications ==
- Inside or Outside? Russia’s Policies Towards NATO Paper Delivered to the Annual Conference of the Centre for Russian Studies at the Norwegian Institute of International Affairs (NUPI) on "The Multilateral Dimension in Russian Foreign Policy," Oslo, 12–13 October 2006, Revised 20 December 2006 FG 5 2007/1 January 2007
- Imperial Overstretch: Germany in Soviet Policy from Stalin to Gorbachev. An Analysis Based on New Archival Evidence, Memoirs, and Interviews. Nomos. 1998. ISBN 9783789051333.
- Adomeit; Hans-Hermann Höhmann; Günter Wagenlehner, eds. (1990). Die Sowjetunion unter Gorbatschow. Kohlhammer Verlag.
- Adomeit; Hans-Hermann Höhmann; Günter Wagenlehner, eds. (1987). Die Sowjetunion als Militärmacht. Kohlhammer Verlag.
- Soviet Risk-Taking and Crisis Behavior: A Theoretical and Empirical Analysis. Allen & Unwin. 1982. ISBN 978-0043350515.
- Adomeit; Robert Boardman (1979). Foreign Policy Making in Communist Countries: A Comparative Approach. Farnborough, Saxon House. ISBN 9780566001857.
