= Ruth E. Adomeit =

American writer, editor, collector of miniature books and philanthropist

- Born: January 30, 1910
- Died: February 16, 1996 (aged 86)
- Occupations: Miniature book author and editor; miniature book collector
- Known for: One of the world's largest collections of miniature books

Ruth E. Adomeit (January 30, 1910 – February 16, 1996) was an American writer, editor, collector of miniature books and philanthropist.

== Life ==
Adomeit was educated at Wellesley College, where she began her interest in miniature books after her father, George Adomeit, gave her two of the Kingsport Press's miniature books by Abraham Lincoln and Calvin Coolidge. She edited The Miniature Book Collector from 1960 to 1962, and was a leading member of the Miniature Book Society. She was also a naturalist with a keen interest in bats and was a "Founder’s Circle member" of Bat Conservation International.

== Miniature book collection ==
After her father sparked her interest in miniature books Ruth started a collection that would be among the largest in the world. The books include miniature volumes by Abraham Lincoln and Calvin Coolidge, as well as miniature form record keeping of cuneiform tablets (2000 B.C.) to contemporary small press and artists' books.

=== Rare books ===
The collection includes many rare books such as From Morn Till Eve, a miniature book that presents biblical quotations in a devotional form, with one phrase for each morning and evening of a month. The Online Computer Library Center (OCLC) had listed "the only known copy as being in the collection of famed miniature book collector Ruth E. Adomeit".

=== Lilly Library ===
Adomeit left her collection of miniature books to Indiana University, where it is housed in the Lilly Library. She also left historical papers, the "Ruth E. Adomeit papers, 1907-1958" concerning her father, and the "George G. Adomeit papers, 1880-1968" to the Archives of American Art.

== Works ==
- Three Centuries of Thumb Bibles: a Checklist, New York: Garland Pub., 1980. "It remains the standard reference book on the subject, essential to any scholar or collector in the field."
- Foreword, in Whitney Balliett, Duke Ellington Remembered: New York notes, Newport Beach, CA: Gold Stein Press, 1981. A short essay in memory of Achille J. St. Onge (Worcester, MA; 1935-1977).
