= Cleveland Society of Artists =

Artist group in Ohio, United States

The Cleveland Society of Artists was a Cleveland, Ohio artists group founded in March, 1913 by George Adomeit and Charles Shackleton to continue the traditions of academic art. Both founders had been members of The Arts Club of Cleveland. The society was for many years a staunch rival to the Bohemian Kokoon Arts Club. It disbanded in September 1983.

== See also ==
- Cleveland School (arts community)
- Cleveland Artists Foundation
