= Ludwig Schmid =

Ludwig Schmid may refer to:

- Ludwig Schmid-Reutte (1863–1909), German painter
- Ludwig Schmid-Wildy (1896–1982), German actor

== See also ==
- Johann Carl Ludwig Schmid
