= Leza McVey =

American artist

Leza Marie McVey
- Born: Leza Marie Sullivan; May 1, 1907; Cleveland, Ohio
- Died: September 24, 1984 (aged 77); Cleveland, Ohio
- Known for: Ceramics, Fiber Art
- Spouse: William Mozart McVey (m. 1932)

Leza Marie McVey (1907–1984) was an American ceramist and weaver. She is known for her large hand-built organic forms.

== Biography ==
McVey née Sullivan was born on April 30 or May 1, 1907 in Cleveland, Ohio. She studied at the Cleveland Institute of Art (1927–1932) and at the Colorado Springs Fine Arts Center (1943–1944). Around the early 30's, McVey's vision began to deteriorate, which continued to deteriorate and affected her throughout her career. In 1932, she married the sculptor William Mozart McVey, and from 1935 to 1947, she worked as a ceramist in Houston, Austin, and San Antonio.

William accepted a teaching position at the Cranbrook Academy of Art in Michigan in 1947, and there McVey met the Finnish artist Maija Grotell. Grotell's creation of large-sized vessels inspired McVey's choice for the majority of her vessels to measure more than 50cm. Based on a recommendation from Grotell, she taught a ceramics course over the summer at Cranbrook. In this time, she also became friends with the Japanese-American artist Toshiko Takaezu who studied at the Cranbrook Academy from 1951 to 1954. In 1953, McVey returned to her native city of Cleveland and established her studio in the suburb of Pepper Pike, Ohio.

McVey's large-scaled, biomorphic, asymmetrical work is said to reflect her dissatisfaction with wheel-thrown pieces and to have led the way for modern ceramic art in the United States. Influenced by surrealism, her sculptural stoneware and porcelain works embody the natural, organic form. As time progressed, her works shifted from using round and soft shapes to harder, more geometric shapes. In 1965, the Cleveland Institute of Art presented a major retrospective of her work that included seventy-five large scale sculptures or what she called "ceramic forms." By 1979 McVey's production slowed due to her failing eyesight.

McVey died on September 24, 1984 in Cleveland, Ohio.

== Collections containing work ==
McVey's work may be found in many collections including the Everson Museum of Art, the Metropolitan Museum of Art, the Museum of Fine Arts, Boston, and the Syracuse University Art Museum.

== Legacy ==
In 2002, the art historian Martin Eidelberg wrote a book entitled, The ceramic forms of Leza McVey, which helped bring her work back into the public eye.
