= August Biehle =

American painter

August Frederick Biehle, Jr. (1885–1979) was an American Modernist painter.

August Biehle, Kokoon Club Ball, Private Collection

== Early life ==
Biehle was born in Cleveland, the son of Christina (Mussler) and August Frederick Biehle, Sr., German immigrants. Biehle trained as an apprentice decorator with his father for the firm of Rorimer Brooks. He went to Europe in 1903 to study painting in Paris and at the Kunstgeverbeschule in Munich. Upon his return to Cleveland in 1905 Biehle went to work for the Sherwin-Williams Company.

== Later career ==
Biehle was a lithographer for Otis Lithography and Continental Lithography Corporation where he remained from 1913-52. Around 1919 he began painting with Henry Keller at Berlin Heights, Ohio, an artist's colony near Sandusky, Ohio. Biehle contributed paintings of both urban and rural Ohio to the American Scene movement of the 1920s and 1930s. Biehle was a member of the Kokoon Arts Club in Cleveland, Ohio, which was founded in 1911 by a group of young Cleveland artists including William Sommer, Carl Moellmann, Morris Grossman, Elmer Brubeck, and Harry Stebner.

He was married in 1921 to the former Mary Theresa Wessler.

== Assessment ==
According to art historian William H. Robinson, "What is perhaps most surprising about modernism in northeast Ohio is the diversity of artists involved. The new art entered the region from many different sources, often bypassing the New York groups normally associated with early modernism in America. August Biehle (1885–1979), an artist almost completely forgotten today, played a pivotal role in this process. The son of a German immigrant painter, Biehle traveled abroad several times seeking artistic training, visiting Germany in 1903 and again in 1910. In 1912, after seeing the first exhibition of the Blue Rider group in Munich, he returned to Cleveland and showed his colleagues his copy of The Blue Rider Almanach containing prints by Kandinsky and discussions of avant-garde art, music, and aesthetic theory. Biehle's own paintings, containing explosive distortions of form and color, established a link between Cleveland artists and the German Expressionists. Yet, like many artists in the region, Biehle worked throughout his long career in a variety of styles, moving with remarkable facility between modernist and more traditional methods of pictorial construction."

The Canton Museum of Art Exhibition Archives describe August Biehle as one of northeast Ohio's most prolific and distinguished artists, with masterful draftsmanship and a superior sense of design. He assimilated aspects of German Expressionism, Fauvism, and Cubism, and moved skillfully between a range of styles, from Jugendstil (a German modernist style) to American Scene painting. He also displayed his versatility by mastering a variety of media and techniques, from graphite drawing to painting in oil, gouache, pastel, and tempera.

== Exhibitions ==
His paintings have previously appeared in numerous exhibitions, including shows at the Cleveland Museum of Art, the Butler Institute of American Art in Youngstown, the Pennsylvania Academy of Fine Arts in Philadelphia, and the Whitney Museum of American Art in New York City.
