= William McVey (sculptor) =

American sculptor

William M. McVey
- Born: July 12, 1905; Boston, Massachusetts.
- Died: May 30, 1995 (aged 89); Cleveland, Ohio
- Education: Cleveland School of Art; Rice University
- Known for: Sculpture
- Spouse: Leza McVey

William Mozart McVey (July 12, 1905 – May 30, 1995) was an American sculptor, animalier and teacher.

== Life ==
He was born in Boston, Massachusetts. His family moved to Cleveland, Ohio, when McVey was still in high school. Following his graduation he attended the Cleveland School of Art. He left to attend Rice University, where he played football under Coach John Heisman in 1924 while studying illustration. He returned to art school in Cleveland but did not study sculpture there because "his personality (was) incompatible with that of Herman Matzen, who headed the department." While studying at night he worked for the Gandola Brothers making tombstones. In 1929, a patron financed a "shoe-string' budgeted trip to Paris, where he studied with Despiau and Gimond as well as earning a meager living as one of three American guides at the Louvre Museum.

In 1932, after three years in Paris, he returned to Cleveland and taught at the Cleveland Museum of Art. Shortly afterwards he was employed by the Works Progress Administration for whom he created several works using the direct carving approach.

Around 1935, McVey returned to Texas to teach at the University of Texas in Austin. During World War II he entered the army and was stationed at Fort Randolph Army Base, where he taught plane and ship silhouette "recognition." Called up to explain why his students were being taught art in their classes, a test of his students showed that they scored higher in "recognition' tests than students taught in the traditional manner, and his approach was subsequently adopted by the other classes.

Following his discharge from the army McVey, then married to "radical" ceramicist Leza McVey, moved to Cranbrook Academy of Art in Bloomfield Hills, Michigan, where he taught sculpture (1947–1954) and she studied with Maija Grotell.

He died in Cleveland, Ohio on May 30, 1995.

His papers are held at Rice University.

== Honors ==
McVey was a member of the National Sculpture Society and exhibited in its 49th Annual Exhibition, "Sculpture, Reliefs, Medals held in New York City in 1982 where he showed a bronze Walrus.

He won the 1964 Cleveland Arts Prize.

== Selected works ==
- "Bruno the Bear" ca. 1933, Cleveland Museum of Natural History, Cleveland, Ohio - New Deal sculpture project
- James Bowie statue, Texarkana, Texas, 1936
- Davy Crockett statue, (1936) monumental Art Deco bas relief granite memorial with Crockett's quote, "Be sure you are right, then go ahead" carved on the front. Ozona, Texas. This and the Bowie statue were commissioned as part of the Texas Centennial celebration.
- Rolling Bear Cubs, (1937) limestone, Houston Zoo, Houston, Texas
- Stone frieze (circa 1938) at the base of the San Jacinto Monument near Houston
- Statue of Winston Churchill (1966), stands outside the British Embassy in Washington D.C.
- George Washington Monument (1972–73), Washington Square, Anthony J. Celebrezze Federal Building, Cleveland, Ohio.
- Orange Lion, 1975 6 ton Bronze
- Icarus, (1990) larger than life-size granite monument in Denison, Texas, for the pioneer pilots of Texas, especially those who gave their lives in various wars.
- Hart Crane Memorial, John and Mildred Putnam Sculpture Collection
- McDog (1985), Cleveland Botanical Gardens in Cleveland, Ohio. Sculpture is of McVey's pet Airedale.
