= George Adomeit =

Prussian-American painter

- Born: George Gustav Adomeit; 15 January 1879; Memel, East Prussia, Prussia, German Empire
- Died: 1967 (aged 87–88); Cleveland, Ohio, United States
- Known for: Painting; Printmaking

George Gustav Adomeit (15 January 1879 – 1967) was a Prussian-American painter and printmaker, and also co-founder and long-time president of the Caxton Company, a printing company that was bought by the Fetter Printing Company in 1955.

== Biography ==
Adomeit was born in Memel, Germany (now Klaipėda, Lithuania), but at the age of four he moved with his family to Cleveland, Ohio, which became his home and which was where he died in 1967.

Heavily involved in the Cleveland art community, he was a member of the Cleveland Society of Artists. His paintings include Down to the Harbor (1925).

His daughter was the book collector Ruth E. Adomeit.

== Notable collections ==
- Cleveland Museum of Art, Cleveland, Ohio
