= Lawrence Edwin Blazey =

American artist and teacher

Lawrence Edwin Blazey (1902–1999) was an American artist and teacher, listed in Who's Who in American Art.

== Early life and career ==
Blazey attended the Cleveland School of Art, now the Cleveland Institute of Art, and later returned to lecture and teach at his alma mater. Blazey was most well known for his paintings of urban areas during the 1920s through the 1930s – several of which are displayed at the Cleveland Museum of Art. He also has pieces at the Butler Museum of Art and in the Cleveland Municipal Collection. He was a painter and advertising illustrator, and also worked with ceramic, gouache, pencil, and enamel.

== Gallery ==
"Pirate" circa 1918
