= ARTneo =

ARTneo: the museum of Northeast Ohio art, formerly the Cleveland Artists Foundation, was founded in 1984. It is a non-profit regional art history organization that explicitly exhibits and collects the works of Northeast Ohio artists. ARTneo also publishes research materials about these artists. Artists ARTneo exhibits include Carl Gaertner, Jean and Paul Ulen, Paul Travis, Henry Keller, Julian Stanczak, Viktor Schreckengost, Edris Eckhardt and hundreds others. The permanent collection contains over 3000 pieces of art.

== Focus ==
The work primarily consists of artists from the Cleveland School of artists, that is the artists who achieved success after attending the Cleveland School of the Arts, now called the Cleveland Institute of Art.
