= Henry Keller =

American painter

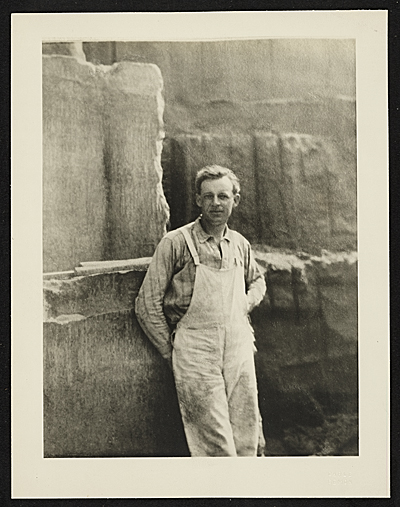
- Henry Keller, ca. 1920, Archives of American Art, Smithsonian Institution.
- Born: April 3, 1869
- Died: August 3, 1949 (aged 80)
- Education: Cleveland School of Art
- Known for: Watercolor painting
- Movement: Cleveland School

Henry George Keller (April 3, 1869 – August 3, 1949) was an American artist who led a generation of Ohio watercolor painters of the Cleveland School. Keller's students at the Cleveland School of Art and his Berlin Heights, Ohio summer school included Charles E. Burchfield, James Kulhanek, Paul Travis, August Biehle, and Frank N. Wilcox.

In the Leslie Family Record, by Elvesta Thomas Leslie (1968, self-published), a first cousin of Henry, spoke of Henry Keller:

"As Mortimer (Leslie) died young, widowhood threw Guineveer’s mother (Elizabeth Bonsor) to the support of herself and her small girl. She met the heavy and double misfortune with fortitude and competency even as you and your (Elvesta’s) aunt Rosa (Kehl) met like but more tragic adversities. She took orders for busts in crayon and hired artists to draw them. In this way she met young Keller, and Guineveer, her romance. Henry made portraits for the mother. Henry Keller was educated here (Cleveland) and in Munich. He was one of a small galaxy of local artists who have won honors in more metropolitan centers. He is a pioneer of the city’s higher cultural life. A harder, or mor conscientious worker can not be found. He maintains his better than average constitution, inherited from German-born parents, by regular life and exemplary habits. He is the only noted artist who doesn’t smoke, that I ever heard of. Cigarettes seem the sustenance of the artistic temperament. Henry teaches painting at the Art School and specializes in animal life and watercolor. I have one of his best. His canvasses are distinguished more for the excellence of their technique and craftsmanship than for creative genius. I found Keller a zealous devotee of his profession and outside of it, enough of a cynic to be realistic. In a word he is master of a fine art, man of fine character and characteristically German. His home was originally a farm house owned by his father before Cleveland grew up to be a city."

In 1939, he was elected into the National Academy of Design as an Associate Academician.

== Selected works ==
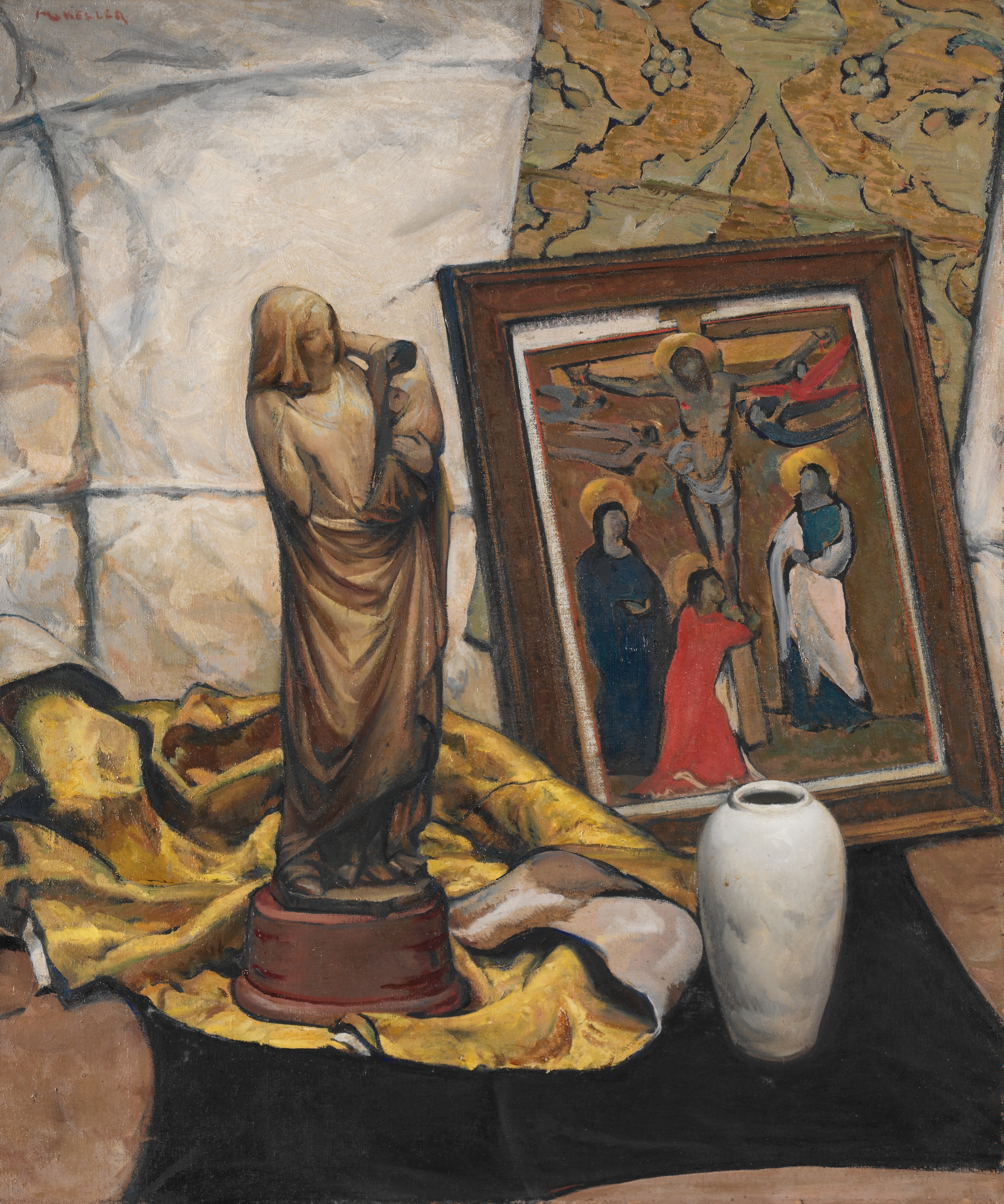
The Madonna of Ivory

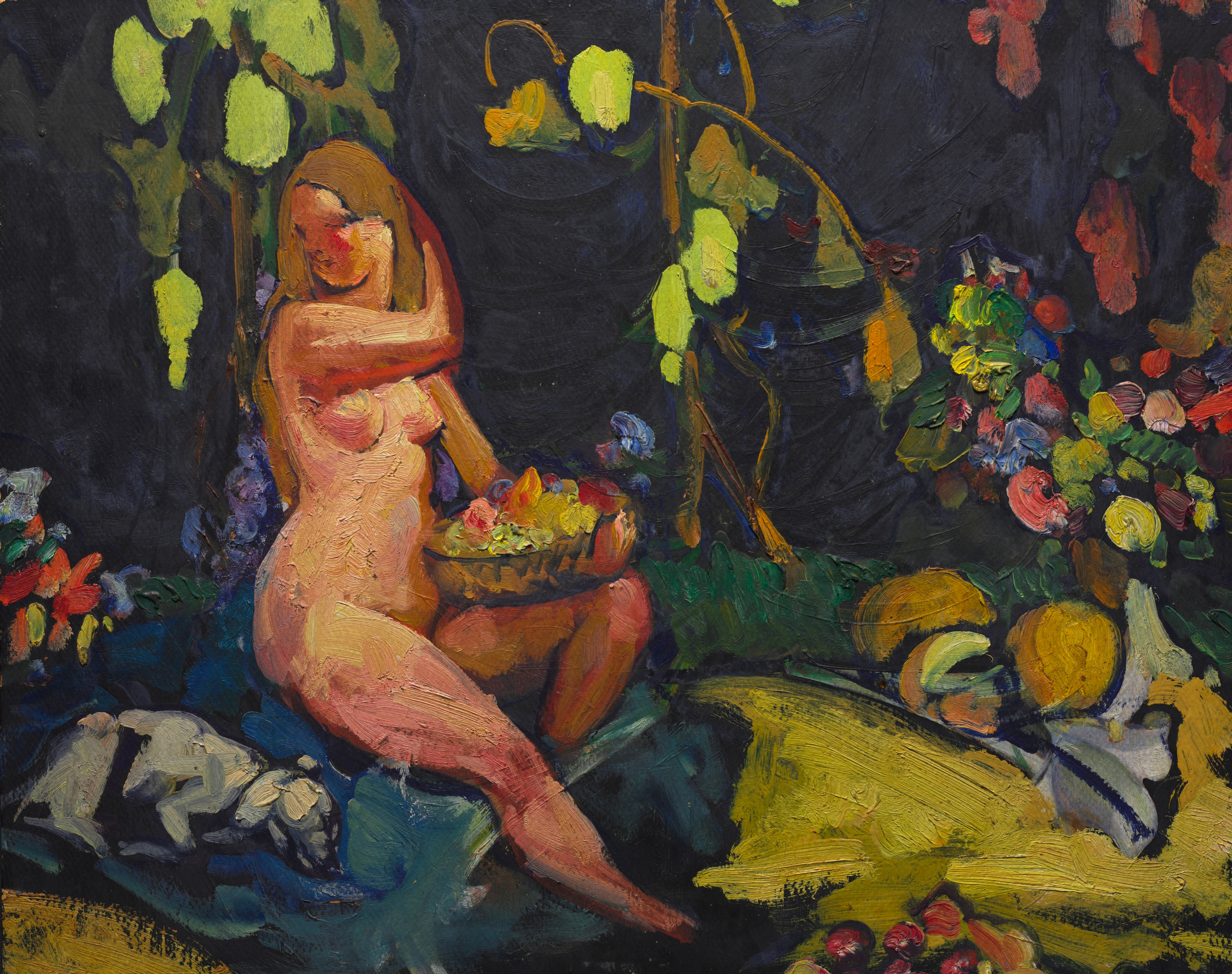
Nude

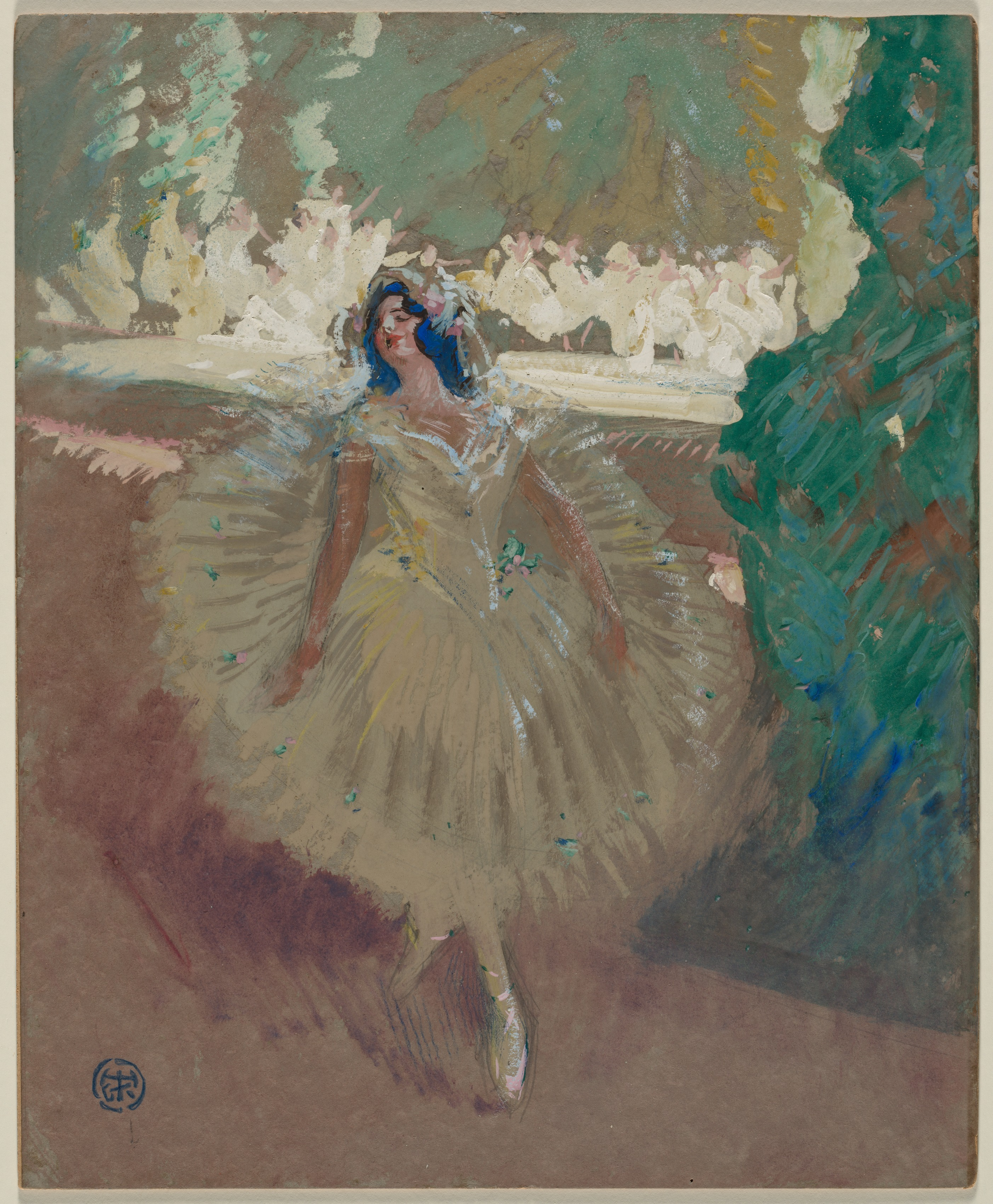
Pavlova
