= List of Alfred University people =

This is a list of notable alumni and faculty of Alfred University, located in Alfred, New York, US.

== Alumni ==
=== Academia ===
- Eva Allen Alberti (1856–1938), dramatics teacher
- Marvin Bell, poet and author, known for protesting the Afghanistan and Iraq wars through his literary work
- Melvil Dewey, librarian, creator of the Dewey Decimal System; attended in 1870 but did not graduate
- Mary McClung, professor of theatrical costume design and puppetry at West Virginia University
- Michael Jones McKean, artist and educator whose emphasis on questioning object, time and anthropological norms have garnered international acclaim

=== Art ===
- Jerry Ackerman (MFA '52), mid-century modern industrial designer and ceramic artist
- Robert Archambeau, ceramic artist
- Arthur Eugene Baggs, ceramic artist and glaze chemist
- R. Guy Cowan, founder, Cowan Pottery
- Andrew Deutsch, electronic and sound artist
- Ken Ferguson, ceramist
- Creig Flessel, comic book artist and author
- Rob Forbes, ceramist, founder of Design Within Reach, and retailer of PUBLIC Bikes
- Julia Galloway, potter and educator
- Maija Grotell, ceramist
- Vivika Heino (MFA), ceramist, the second M.F.A. graduate from the ceramics program (following Daniel Rhodes)
- Ka Kwong Hui (BFA 1951, MFA 1952), potter, ceramist, and educator
- Amy Karle, bioartist, provocateur and futurist
- Jae Won Lee, ceramic artist and educator
- Courtney M. Leonard, artist and filmmaker
- Charles Loloma, Hopi potter, business owner and director of plastic arts education
- Otellie Loloma, Hopi potter, dancer and art educator
- Nathan Lyons (1957), founder, director emeritus of Visual Studies Workshop
- Ying Miao, MFA 2009, mixed media contemporary artist
- Kristen Morgin, sculptor
- Sandra Murchinson, multimedia artist and director of the School of Art and Design at Eastern Michigan University
- Minnie Negoro (1919–1998), ceramic artist
- Elizabeth Overbeck, ceramic artist, of the famed Overbeck Sisters
- Kenneth Price, modern ceramic sculptor
- Daniel Rhodes, ceramist and noted author on ceramic technique
- Adelaïde Alsop Robineau, potter, china painter, one of the top ceramists at turn of the 19th century
- Annabeth Rosen, sculptor
- Siona Shimshi, painter, sculptor, ceramist, and textile designer
- Robert C. Turner, ceramist, professor emeritus of ceramic art at Alfred until 1979
- Lydia Wallace-Chavez, member of the Unkechaug Nation and Kainai Nation, wampum artisan
- Betty Woodman, ceramic artist who studied at the School for American Craftsmen when it was located in the liberal arts program at Alfred University in 1948–49
- Arnold Zimmerman, modern sculptor

=== Business ===
- Robert H. Benmosche 1966, CEO of American International Group; chairman, Metropolitan Life Insurance Company
- Peter Cuneo 1967, chairman of Cuneo and Co. and Marvel Enterprises, Inc
- Mary Lewis Langworthy (1872–1949), dramatic coach, writer, lecturer, clubwoman, and executive
- Rodney O. Martin, Jr., chairman and CEO, Voya Financial
- Steven Pressman, economist with extensive experience in poverty and middle-class issues

=== Entertainment ===
- Chagmion Antoine, openly bisexual network news journalist
- Rob Bartlett, comedian
- David Finfer, film editor (The Fugitive, Lost in America)
- Robert Forster, Oscar-nominated actor (Jackie Brown), attended for two years
- Bob Keeshan, better known as Captain Kangaroo, received an honorary doctorate from Alfred in 1969
- Robert Klein, actor and comedian
- Lew Palter, actor
- Bill Pullman, actor (While You Were Sleeping, Independence Day), received an honorary doctorate in 2011; board of trustees member
- Kat Wright, singer and songwriter, has toured and recorded as Kat Wright & the Indomitable Soul Band

=== Engineering ===
- Flora A. Brewster (1852–1919), physician, surgeon, inventor
- Samuel Hulbert, biomedical engineer; pioneer in ceramic devices; president of Rose-Hulman Institute of Technology
- Lowell Fitz Randolph, plant scientist (crop and plant genetics) and author (1894–1980)

=== Literature ===
- Cora Belle Brewster (1859–1937), physician, surgeon, medical writer, editor
- Ward Churchill, writer and political activist; received an honorary doctorate in 1992
- Mary Bassett Clarke (1831–1908), writer
- Peter Jenkins, author whose best-selling book A Walk Across America begins in Alfred
- Robert Littell, author of nearly twenty spy novels including The Company, which became a 2007 TV miniseries starring Michael Keaton, as well as The Defection of A.J. Lewinter and The Once and Future Spy
- Steve Skeates, comic book creator, author and Marvel and DC alum

=== Politics ===
- Chris Beck, retired United States Navy SEAL, author, former human rights advocate, Democratic candidate for Congress in the 2016 Maryland primaries
- Cathy Bissoon, United States district judge, United States District Court for the Western District of Pennsylvania
- William Wallace Brown, United States congressman from Pennsylvania (1883–87)
- Burrows Burdick, Wisconsin physician and legislator
- David Chesnoff, criminal defense attorney
- George P. Darrow, United States congressman from Pennsylvania
- Dean Fuleihan, first deputy mayor of New York City
- Rufus Mallory, United States congressman from Oregon (1867-1869), speaker of the Oregon State House (1872-1873)
- Karla Moskowitz, associate justice, New York Supreme Appellate Court
- Nancy Nadel, city council member, Oakland, California
- Tony Ninos, Democrat who served in the Florida House of Representatives
- Mike Pellicciotti, politician and Washington state treasurer
- Tom Reed, United States congressman from New York (2010–2022), mayor of Corning, New York (2008–2010)
- Henry Moore Teller, United States congressman from Colorado (1876–82, 1885–1909), secretary of the interior (1882–85)
- Mandana Coleman Thorp (1843–1916), public official
- Augustus Everett Willson, governor of Kentucky (1907–1911)

=== Sports ===
- Oluwale Bamgbose, professional mixed martial artist, formerly competing in the UFC's middleweight division
- Bob Beyer, basketball head coach
- Les Goble, American football player
- James Adelbert McLane, athletic director and coach
- Frank Trigilio, American football player
- Ray Witter, American football player
- Alex Yunevich, American football player and coach

== Faculty ==
- Charles Fergus Binns, author, educator and "the father of American studio ceramics"
- Andrew Deutsch, video and sound artist, noise musician and educator
- Wayne Higby, ceramic artist; known for work in Raku ceramics and large bowl forms
- Michael Kay, controversial educator who supported equal rights for students of color
- Timothy Z. Keith, doctor of psychology
- Hongwei Li, sculptor, former faculty; works have been exhibited at the Louvre and the Art Institute of Chicago
- Walter McConnell, ceramic artist and ceramics instructor
- Daniel Rhodes, ceramic artist, sculptor, author and educator
- Robert Chapman Turner, ceramics artist; founded the ceramics program at Black Mountain College
- William Underhill, instructor and sculptor of King Alfred in Alfred University's quad
