= Maryknoll School =

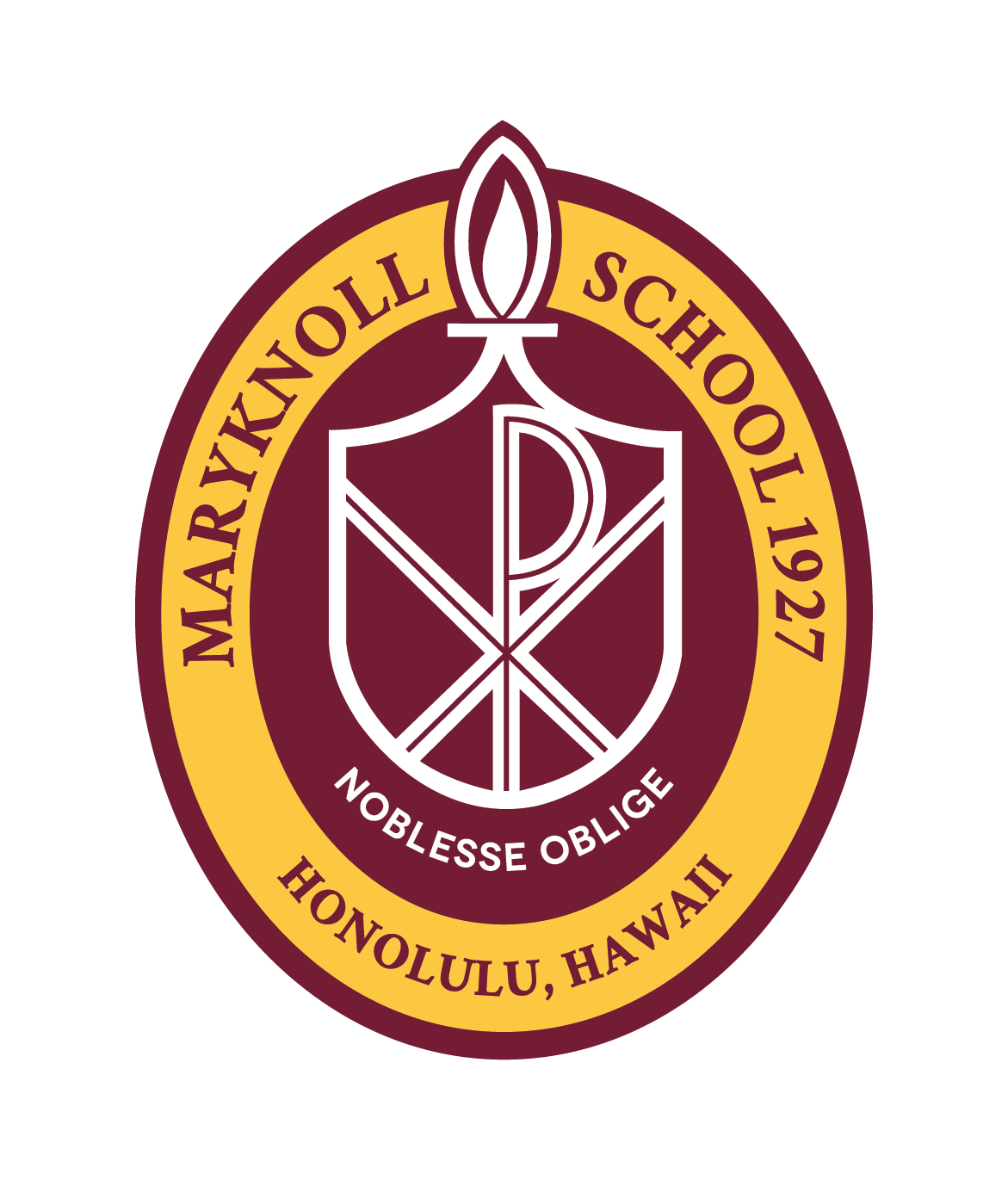

Location
- 1526 Alexander Street; Honolulu, Hawaii 96822; United States; 21°18′5″N 157°50′2″W

Information
- Type: Private, Coeducational
- Motto: Noblesse oblige (Nobility obligates: To whom much is given, much is expected.)
- Religious affiliation: Catholic Church (Maryknoll)
- Established: 1927
- Superintendent: Llewellyn Young
- President: Shana Tong
- Rector: Father Ace Tui
- Principal, Academic Visionary: Carol Chong, M.Ed
- Grades: Pre-K - 12
- Campus type: Urban
- Colors: Maroon and Gold
- Slogan: The Future Is Yours
- Athletics conference: Interscholastic League of Honolulu (ILH)
- Mascot: Spartans
- Team name: Spartans
- Accreditation: Western Association of Schools and Colleges
- Publication: The Knoller
- Newspaper: Chi Rho Knoller
- Yearbook: Tribute
- Website: maryknollschool.org

Maryknoll School is a private, coeducational Catholic school serving children in Pre-Kindergarten through twelfth grade in Honolulu, Hawaiʻi. The school is located on the island of Oʻahu and is administered by the Diocese of Honolulu in association with its original founders, the Maryknoll Society of brothers and priests and the Maryknoll Congregation also called the Maryknoll Sisters. The school is the largest Catholic School in the state of Hawaii, and the fifth largest private school in the state. Maryknoll has developed 6 sister schools and 5 affiliated school connections, in China, Japan, and Vietnam.

== History ==
Maryknoll School was established on September 5, 1927. Ten Maryknoll Sisters from New York arrived in Hawaii by the invitation of Bishop Stephen Alencastre. Six of the ten original Sisters opened Maryknoll School as the parish school for Sacred Heart Church, Punahou. The school started out as a one-story wood-frame building containing four classrooms. It was blessed, dedicated, and opened with a student body of 93 boys and 77 girls in the lower grade levels. The six Maryknoll Sisters constituted the first faculty. This campus served as both the grade school and high school campus until the need for expansion for the high school division in 1931 was realized.

On December 16, 1947, The MacDonald Hotel on 1402 Punahou Street was sold to Sacred Heart Church for the expansion of Maryknoll's high school campus. At that time, the school occupied about 3.6 acres.

== Campus ==
There are two campuses known as the Grade School and the High School campus.

=== Grade School ===
The grade school campus located on 1722 Dole St. houses grades Pre-Kindergarten through 8th grade. Buildings on campus include the Knoll Building, Building A, Building B, the Maryknoll Community Center Gym (MCC), Admin Building, and an underground parking lot. In 2018, an area of grass placed between Building B and Building A called The Great Lawn, finished construction. Multiple events such as Maryknoll's Makeke on the Lawn, Noblesse Oblige Christmas, and Spartan Run, are hosted on The Great Lawn. The campus also includes two outdoor basketball courts with above ground parking lots located near Sacred Heart Church and Bachelot Hall.

==== Maryknoll Community Center (MCC) ====
The Maryknoll Community Center, also known as the gym and Clarence T.C. Ching Gymnasium, is an air conditioned, 35,000 square feet structure, with automatic retractable bleachers, soundproof insulation, and an NBA-regulation basketball court. The MCC first opened in September 2009 and is large enough to fit Maryknoll's faculty, staff, and student body inside. Events hosted here include athletic games, practices, Tony Stiletto Hawaii Invitational, Physical Education Class (P.E), Pep Rally, and Mass.

Inside the MCC is a fitness center and Alumni Hospitality Room.

==== Bachelot Hall ====
Bachelot Memorial Hall (now also known as the Maryknoll's Performing Arts Center) was originally dedicated in June 1923 and added to the National Register of Historical Places in 2001. Bachelot Hall is connected to Kosasa Garden and the Sacred Hearts Church rectory. Bachelot Hall is named after Father Alexis Bachelot.

Bachelot Hall is a campus gathering place for Maryknoll school events.

===== Renovation =====
In 2021, Maryknoll School started fundraising for the renovation of Bachelot Hall with a goal of $3 million. Maryknoll received two donations that totaled to $2 million from Dr. Tom and Mrs. Mi Kosasa, and the Clarence T.C. Ching Foundation. The renovation lasted 18 months and finished in the last quarter of 2024. The total renovation costed $6.7 million.

The renovation was considered a complete restoration. Notable renovations include new and painted walls/ceiling, replaced carpet with wood planks, installation of two bathrooms, light fixtures, full stage, projector system, sound engineer system, mounted speakers, upstairs balcony, and kitchen. Main contractors that worked together on the Hall's renovation include Ralph S. Inouye Co. Ltd., Mason Architects, and Coffman Engineers. Coffman Engineers provided civil, electrical, mechanical, structural, fire protection, and corrosion control engineering. Ralph S. Inouye Co. Ltd. Was contracted to do rough and complete carpentry, and finish concrete. Air Central LLC supplied air condition to the main stage and throughout the building and installed flashing and gutters.

Bachelot Hall Renovation Subcontractors List In alphabetical order:

- Affiliated Construction LLC
- Air Central LLC
- Akira Yamamoto Painting Inc.
- Alii Glass & Metal Inc.
- Eagle Interiors Inc.
- Ford Audio-Video Systems LLC
- Hawaii Stage & Lighting Rentals Inc.
- Hawaiian Isle Electric LLC
- Honolulu Fire Protection LLC
- Island Flooring Jayar Construction Inc.
- Jayco Hawaii Inc.
- Metal-Weld Specialties Inc.
- Road Builders Corp.
- Simmons Steel Corp.
- Skippy's Plumbing & Repair Inc.
- Tokunaga Masonry Inc.
- Tulba's Roofing Tyson's Inc.
- Unitek Insulation Inc.

=== High School ===
The high school campus located on 1402 Punahou St. includes grades 9–12. Events such as Maryknoll's Fall Fest are located on this campus. The high school campus is roughly 1.8 acres. The entrance, designed by Dana Anne Yee, was recognized by Scenic Hawaii, the American Society of Landscape Architects (ASLA) for an Award of Merit in 2006, and a Betty Crocker Landscape Award of Excellence in 2004. Buildings include Building A, Building B, and Founder's Hall. The Learning Commons is in Building A. Roger's Hall is an open space between Building A and Building B. The high school campus also has a parking lot with a one-way driveway.

== Clubs ==
Maryknoll High School is host to 27 clubs and teams, while Maryknoll grade school houses 7. Clubs are open to everyone to join during the club fair in August.

=== Arts Ministry ===
@maryknollarts

In Arts Ministry, students work together with other artists every 2-3 weeks to paint faith-based murals. These murals serve as art pieces behind the alter during school wide masses. Each mural is roughly 10 x 5 ft. and is a collaboration of student’s original work. Arts Ministry has been an active club since 2017 and creates 5-6 new murals each year.

=== Campus Ministry ===
@maryknollcampusministry

Maryknoll Campus Ministry is divided into 3 categories: altar servers, LIFE Teen, and Music Ministry. The Campus Ministry covers all faith-based activities on campus such as blessings, mass, and student/teacher retreats.

=== Maryknoll Chalkboard ===
@maryknollchalkboard

Maryknoll Chalkboard has been making chalk drawings since 2019. The chalkboard is located near the front gate of the high school and is consistently adorned with drawings that correspond to holidays and school events. Common chalkboard drawings include spirit week, Halloween, Christmas, Earth Day, inspirational messages, and puns.

=== Chi Rho Knoller Newspaper ===
@maryknollnewspaper

The Chi Rho Knoller Newspaper is Maryknoll High School’s school newspaper. It distributes every quarter (four times a school year) and includes school events and real-world happenings. Sections include: The Front Page, School News, Spartan Sports, Picture Gallery, Features, Opinion/Entertainment, Raffle, and The Back. Printing happens inside the school, and issues are about the size of a tabloid magazine (8.5 in x 11 in.) Members of the newspaper can write articles, take pictures, draw comics, and gain exclusive access to school events.

=== Chinese Club ===
In Chinese Club, members meet once per quarter (four times per school year) to participate in popular Chinese themed activities. These activities include decorating paper lanterns for the moon festival, drinking boba and playing ping pong, and hosting games for the lunar new year. Members will also get to eat traditional Chinese food, go on field trips, and collaborate with the other Asian clubs on campus.

=== Maryknoll Civil Air Patrol ===
The Maryknoll Cadet Squadron (PCR-HI-030) is one of ten local units that are part of the Hawaii Wing. At Maryknoll, CAP is taken as a course and can be taken in replacement of PE I, II, and III. In Civil Air Patrol cadets will have the opportunity to learn how to fly a powered aircraft and learn leadership along with Civil Air Patrol’s core values of integrity, volunteer service, excellence, and respect.

=== Culinary Club ===
Maryknoll High School’s Culinary Club provides opportunity for students to learn how to cook different dishes. Dishes have ranged from omelet making to steak dinner tutorial. Each student is given their own portable stove to use during meetings, most commonly during lunch time.

=== Filipino Club ===
Students can experience the Filipino culture and its traditions; like making lumpia, halo-halo, and learn traditional dances such as tinikling. Since 2024, students can also learn more about the Filipino culture in the Filipino curriculum offered at the high school. The curriculum was created through the work of the Filipino Curriculum Project.

=== GlamourGals ===
GlamourGals is an American based organization that fosters the growth of leadership skills. Each chapter is led by a volunteer leadership team that engages with senior centers in their local community. Maryknoll Glamour Gals engages with the Arcadia senior home and paints nails.

=== Maryknoll Key Club ===
@maryknoll.keyclub

The Maryknoll Key Club is part of region 18, Division 22: Hikina. Key Club is an international, student-led organization originally founded in Sacramento High School California. Through community service, this club promotes Key Club’s core values of caring, character-building, inclusiveness, and leadership.

=== LIFE Teen ===
@maryknollcampusministry

The Maryknoll LIFE Teen is a core part of the Campus Ministry. A select group of students is chosen at the end of their junior year to be part of the group that participates in all faith-based activities on campus, such as blessings, mass, and student/teacher retreats. It is based on the international LIFE Teen organization, which provides Catholic youth ministry opportunities for people’s communities. LIFE Teen is available only to seniors.

=== Maryknoll Math Team ===
The Maryknoll Math Team competes in the mathematics competitions hosted by the Oahu Mathematics League (OML) in the Newton League. The Maryknoll Math Team also competes in the Hawaii State Math Bowl hosted by Brigham Young University Hawaii (BYUH) in Division A and has placed in the top 2 at Hawaii State Math Bowl XXXIII in 2011 and Hawaii State Math Bowl XLII competition in 2022.

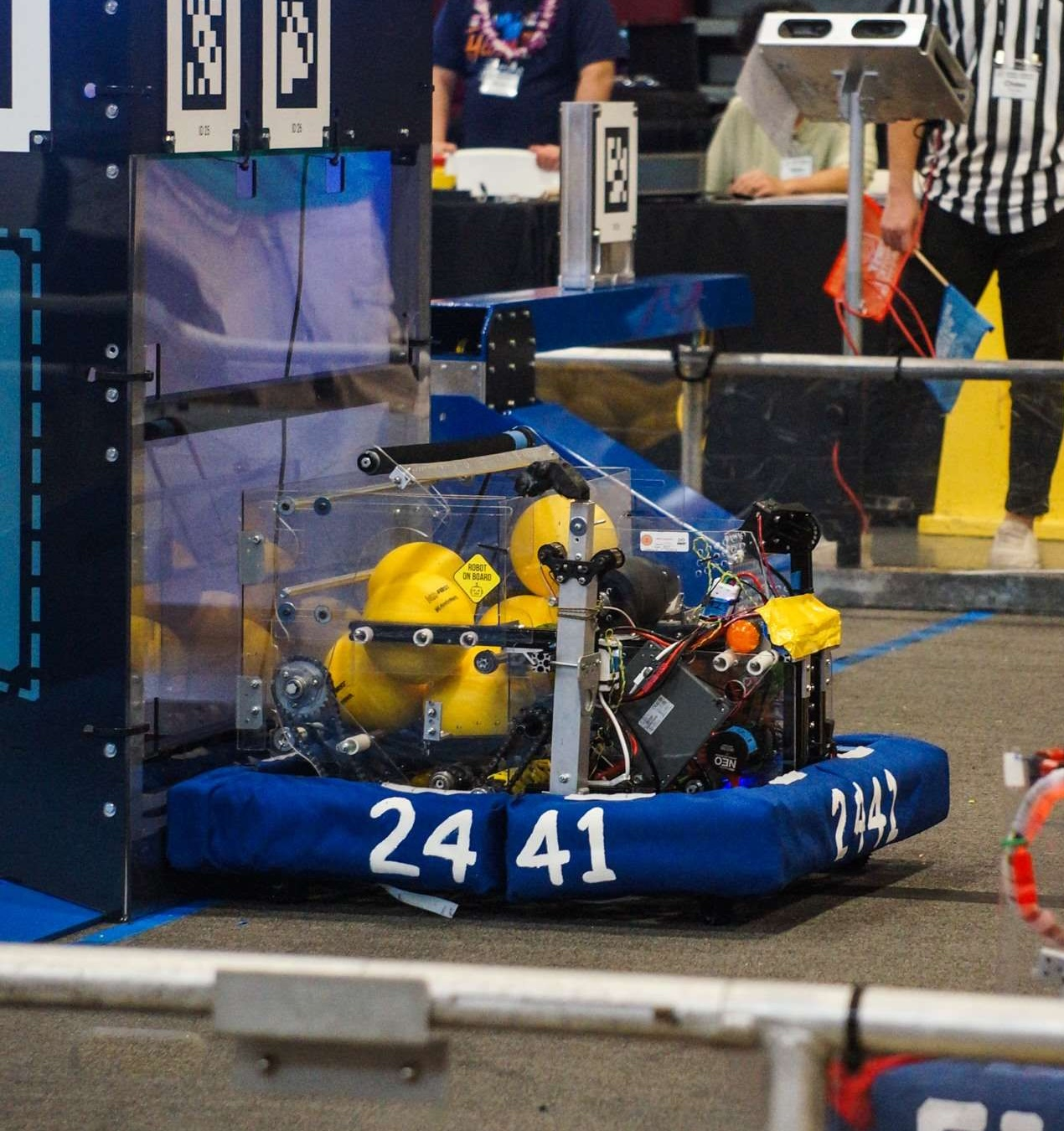
The Maryknoll Robotics Team robot competing at the 2026 FRC Hawaii Regional.

=== Maryknoll Robotics Team ===
@maryknollrobotics

The Maryknoll Robotics Team competes in the FIRST Robotics Competition (FRC) as team 2441, the Spartechs. Robotics members have the opportunity to learn all aspects of STEM through work in electrical, coding, safety, mechanical, Computer-Aided Design (CAD) and business teams through teamwork and mentorship.

The Spartechs have been competing in the Hawaii Regional (HIHO) annually since 2008.

In the 2026 FRC season Rebuilt, the Spartechs ranked 11th at the 2026 Hawaii Regional as captain of Alliance 7 along with Team 9012 (Assets School) and Team 6704 (Mid-Pacific Institute).

In the 2019 FRC season, Destination: Deep Space, the Spartechs competed in the 2019 FIRST Championship in Houston, Texas. The team was the second pick of Alliance 2 at the Hawaii Regional and was given a Wildcard to compete at Worlds along with Team 2443 (Blue Thunder of Maui High School).

=== The TOAD ===
@maryknollarts

The TOAD is Maryknoll High School’s award-winning, student-led, literary magazine. Under the American Scholastic Press Association (ASPA), the TOAD won the 1st-place distinction for 5 consecutive years until the ASPA’s halt of yearbook, magazine, and newspaper entries in January 2025. The TOAD then received the Superior award for the REALM Literary Magazine contest for their 2025 edition “TOAD: Evening on the Bayou.”

The TOAD was founded in 1981, and was originally named “The Aegis.” Later, the publication went through a name change to be “The TOAD,” which stemmed from the driveway being overrun with toads at that time. The TOAD publishes a variety of art which includes but is not limited to: paintings, drawings, poetry, photography, pottery, other forms of 3D art, musical scores, code, etc.

== Traditions ==
=== Class Color ===
Each class/grade level that goes through Maryknoll School has an assigned class color of yellow, red, blue, or green given to them at the time they enter. The aforementioned order listed is the order they are given in. These class colors make appearances throughout a grade level’s time at Maryknoll. When the class reaches high school, there will only be one set of these colors present. Classes are affectionately referred to as The Yellow Class, The Red Class, The Blue Class, or The Green Class. Aloha Wear, which is given to a class at their Junior Commitment Ceremony, will don a grade level’s class color as the predominant complementary color along with a black/white base.

=== Spirit Week ===
Spirit Week is a weeklong tradition that takes place around mid to early September. Students on both campuses dress up according to different themes that correspond to each day. On the Friday of that week, the theme is to wear their Class Color, and the high school students get to compete in Field Day at Makiki Park and Pep Rally, which is held in the MCC. Games such as tug-of-war, capture the flag, three-legged race, dodgeball, and more are played. The Maryknoll High School Student Senate chooses the dress-up themes and games to be played.

=== Class Aloha Wear ===
Class Aloha Wear is a garment that is worn by the juniors and seniors at Mass and other class events. It is debuted at the Junior Commitment Ceremony. The pattern on the garments usually symbolizes a grade level’s journey throughout their time at Maryknoll School. Males wear a collared button up, while females will wear a maxi length dress with a round neckline. Common designers for a class' Aloha Wear are Kini Zamora and Missing Polynesia.

=== Junior Commitment Ceremony ===
Junior Commitment Ceremony (JCC) takes place in early February. Each year, the current junior class will attend along with their grade-level advisors. Parents are also invited. This ceremony marks the beginning of a class’s journey to their senior year at Maryknoll School. Juniors will recite the Maryknoll Pledge, receive their class rings if ordered (supplied by Jostens), and class pins. They will sing “Weave One Heart” by Marty Haugen. Juniors debut their aloha wear.

==== Maryknoll Pledge ====
We your sons and daughters,

Pledge ourselves to your ideals;

To the strength that comes from sacrifice,

To the courage that conquers self,

To the loyalty which defends your honor,

To the perseverance which gives victory in life,

By daring to imitate Him whom you represent.

=== Breakfast With the Bishop ===
Breakfast with the Bishop is a tradition held across all six catholic high schools in Hawaii. Maryknoll School has been participating in this senior tradition since before the COVID-19 pandemic started. The senior class will have breakfast with the current appointed bishop of Honolulu, and have the opportunity to ask him questions, and receive advice about how to move forward in life and in faith.

=== Baccalaureate Mass ===
Baccalaureate Mass is one out of three final senior events that lead up to Commencement. It is a traditional catholic mass, while also providing the graduating class with the chance to seek guidance and express gratitude from God and for their supporters as they transition into the next chapter of their life. The Maroon and Gold Society (also known as lifers) are honored with their parents and each given a koa wood bowl.

=== Class Night ===
Class night is two out of three final senior events that lead up to the Annual Commencement. Held at Hawaii Theater, the community gathers to honor the senior class’s achievements and milestones such as club participation, department awards, and athletic awards. During Class Night is the symbolic “passing of the torch” to the junior class. It symbolizes the junior and senior classes moving forward as the juniors become seniors and are entrusted with the values and legacy of Maryknoll.

=== Annual Commencement ===
Maryknoll School’s Annual Commencement is the last senior event that takes place for a class. Commencement is held at the Neal S. Blaisdell Area/Concert Hall. Traditionally, commencement is held on the first Friday of June. During commencement, seniors sing their Class Song which had been voted on earlier in the year, Pu’u Malia by Mailani Makainai '98, and the Maryknoll Alma Mater.

=== List of Traditionally Sung Songs ===
- Maryknoll Alma Mater by Virginia Lum '72
- Weave One Heart by Marty Haugen
- Pu'u Malia by Mailani Makainai '98

== Early College Programs ==
=== Hawaii Pacific University (HPU) Dual Credit Program ===
Maryknoll School has partnered with Hawaii Pacific University (HPU) since the 2017-2018 school year to provide dual credit programs on the HPU campus. Students enrolled in the HPU Dual Credit Program attend most of their classes on HPU’s downtown campus in the fall and spring semesters. Students can enter this program their junior or senior year through an interview/application process. Students who enter in their junior year must complete a sufficient number of credits (60) to earn an HPU Associate of Arts degree in General Studies through the College of Extended and Interdisciplinary Education at the same time as their Maryknoll School diploma at the end of their senior year.

=== University of Hawaii at Manoa (UH) Dual Credit Program ===
Maryknoll School has partnered with the University of Hawaii at Manoa (UH) system since the spring 2024 semester to provide college-level coursework on its high school campus taught by university professors. PSY 100 and SOC 100 are offered asynchronously.

Fall Courses: ECON 130 (Economics), ENG 100 (English), and PSY 100 (Psychology).

Spring Courses: ECON 131, ENG 200, and SOC 100 (Sociology).

Students will receive high school credit and college credit depending on their respective college’s requirements.

== See also ==
- Maryknoll
