= Springfield College =

Private college in Springfield, Massachusetts, US

Coordinates: 42°6′15.6″N 72°33′18.2″W

- Former names: YMCA of School for Christian Workers in Springfield (1885–1891); International Young Men's Christian Association Training School (1891–1912); International YMCA College (1912–1954)
- Motto: Spirit, Mind, Body
- Type: Private university
- Established: 1885; 141 years ago
- Academic affiliations: CIC; YMCA; CCGS
- Endowment: $79.6 million (2020)
- President: Mary-Beth A. Cooper
- Students: 2,984
- Undergraduates: 1,939
- Postgraduates: 1,045
- Location: Springfield, Massachusetts, U.S.
- Campus: Main campus size: 100 acres (40 ha) East campus size: 81 acres (33 ha)
- Colors: Maroon and white
- Nickname: Pride
- Sporting affiliations: NCAA Division III – NEWMAC
- Mascot: Spirit the Majestic Lion
- Website: springfield.edu
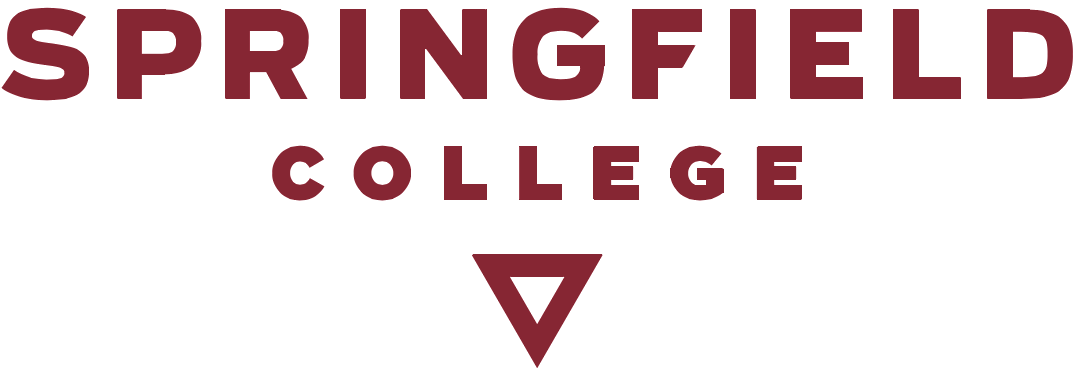

- Location within Massachusetts

Springfield College is a private university in Springfield, Massachusetts, United States. The institution's mission, called the Humanics philosophy, calls for educating students in spirit, mind, and body for leadership in service to others. It is also notable for its historical significance as the birthplace of basketball, which was invented on campus in 1891 by Canadian-American instructor and graduate student James Naismith.

== History ==
Founded in 1885, as the Young Men's Christian Association department of the School for Christian Workers in Springfield, the school originally specialized in preparing young men to become General Secretaries of YMCA organizations in a two-year program. In 1887, it added a Physical Education department. In 1890, it separated from the School for Christian Workers and became the YMCA Training School and in 1891, the International Young Men's Christian Association Training School.

In 1905, the school became a degree-granting institution. In 1912, it took the name International YMCA College and in 1954, Springfield College.

=== Archives ===
Since 1999, the institutional archives have included archival material from the Society of Health and Physical Educators and some of its affiliates, including the papers of their leaders.

=== Presidents ===
Springfield College has had 13 leaders:

Years	Name
1885–1891	David Allen Reed
1891–1893	Henry S. Lee
1893–1896	Charles S. Barrows
1896–1936	Laurence L. Doggett
1937–1946	Ernest M. Best
1946–1952	Paul M. Limbert
1953–1957	Donald C. Stone
1958–1965	Glenn A. Olds
1965–1985	Wilbert E. Locklin
1985–1992	Frank S. Falcone
1992–1998	Randolph W. Bromery
1999–2013	Richard B. Flynn
2013–	Mary-Beth A. Cooper

== Academics ==
Springfield College offers bachelor's degrees in more than 40 majors, 25-plus master's degrees, and doctoral programs in counseling psychology, educational leadership, medical science, physical therapy, physical education and more. The institution is accredited by the New England Commission of Higher Education (NECHE).

The institution comprises three schools:

- School of Arts and Sciences
- School of Physical Education, Performance, and Sport Leadership: This school incorporates the Springfield College East Campus Outdoor Learning Center.
- School of Health Sciences: The school is a member of the College of Health Deans.

Springfield College also offers bachelor's degree completion programs and master's degrees in business, education, counseling and more, that are geared toward working adult students at its main campus, and online. Additionally, they are one of the few universities in the United States that offers a dedicated Sport and Exercise Psychology program

=== Rankings ===
Academic rankings

National
- U.S. News & World Report: 216
- Washington Monthly: 366

U.S. News & World Report ranked Springfield College #26 for Best Regional Universities—North Region for 2021, the sixth consecutive year that it has been in the top 30. U.S. News also ranked Springfield College #18 among Best Value Schools for Regional Universities—North, the school's fifth consecutive year on the list.

Springfield College was the recipient of the 2016 Presidential Award in the education category of the President's Higher Education Community Service Honor Roll. This honor is the highest federal recognition a college or university can receive for its commitment to volunteering, service-learning, and civic engagement.

In 2015, the institution successfully for an optional community engagement classification in the Carnegie Classification of Institutions of Higher Education.

Springfield College was named the 2016–17 College of Distinction for providing a teacher-centered undergraduate education.

== Campus ==
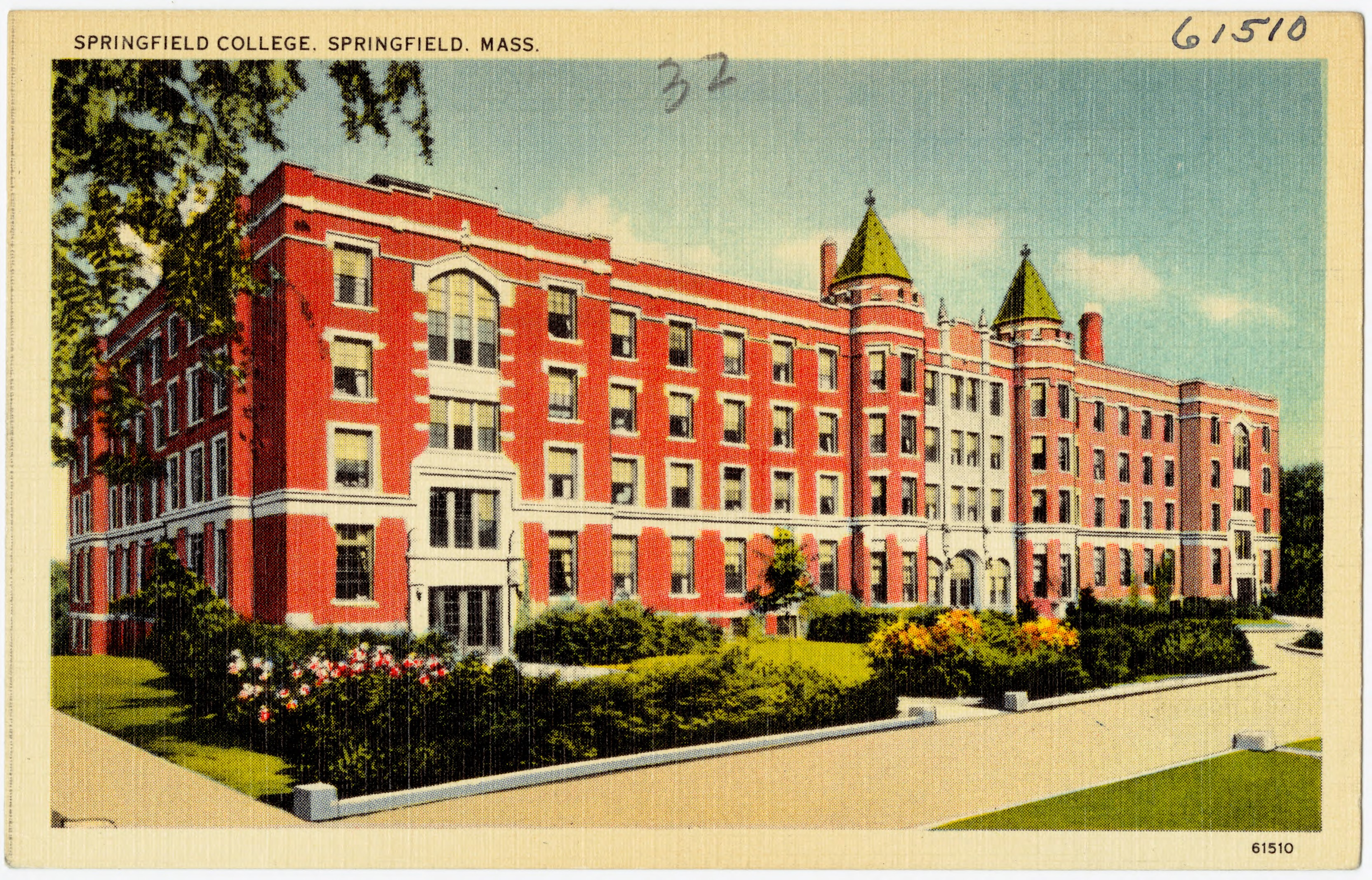
A postcard from 1930–1945 of Springfield College

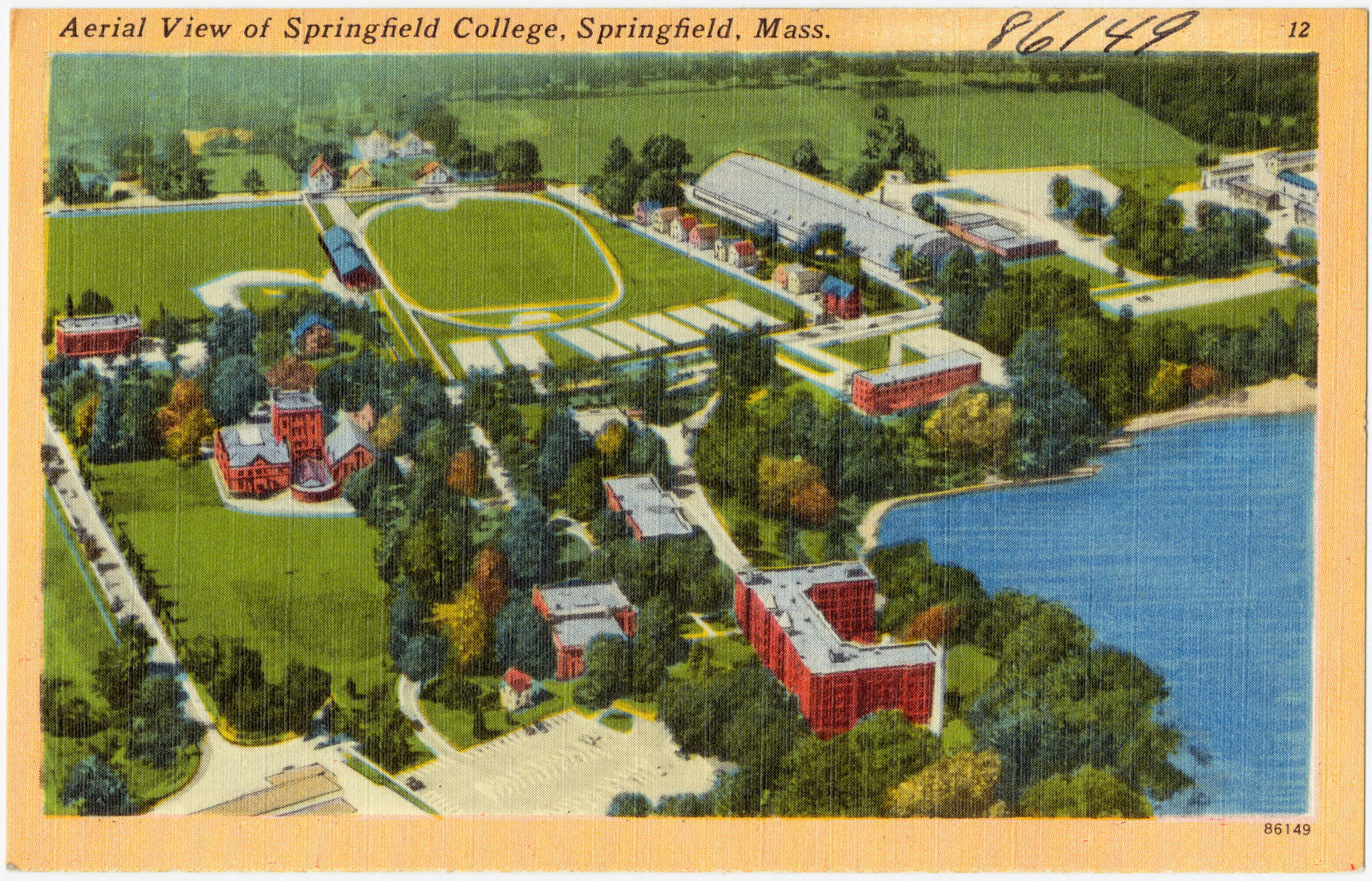
A postcard from 1930–1945 of an aerial view of Springfield College

The campus of Springfield College is located in Springfield, Massachusetts. The main campus spans 100 acres (40 ha) and contains ten residence halls, recreational and fitness facilities, science and academic facilities, a performing arts center, and the Flynn Campus Union, which includes a food court, activity and lounge space, and bookstore.

In fall 2023, Springfield College opened a new Health Sciences Center, which facilitates, expands on, and celebrates interprofessional education. Inside the four floors of the 86,000-square-foot building, simulation, anatomy, pediatrics lab, and makerspace environments enhance interdisciplinary collaboration as does expanded meeting space.

Springfield College's East Campus, which encompasses 57 acres (23 ha) of forest ecosystem, is located about one mile from the main campus.

== Athletics ==
Springfield College athletics logo

Springfield College's athletic teams have been known since 1995 as the Pride; the teams were nicknamed the Chiefs from 1968 through 1994, and prior to that were known as the Gymnasts or Maroons. The institution is a member of National Collegiate Athletic Association (NCAA) Division III and most teams compete in the New England Women's and Men's Athletic Conference (NEWMAC). Springfield's football team joined the NEWMAC when it began sponsoring football in 2017. The men's soccer, men's golf, cross country and gymnastics teams are affiliate members of the Eastern College Athletic Conference (ECAC). The men's volleyball team competes as an independent.

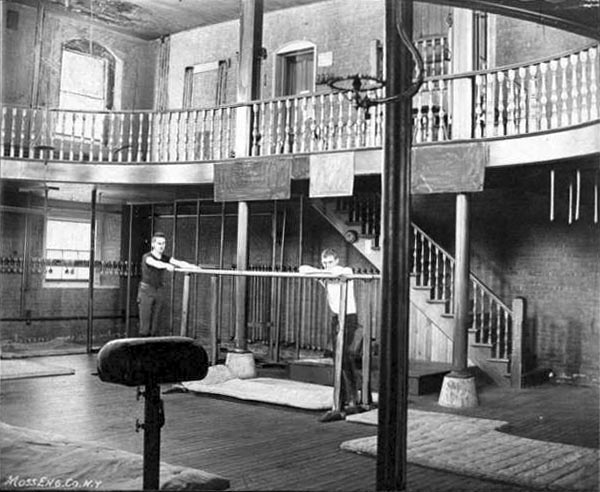
The gymnasium where basketball was invented in the School for Christian Workers (name of Springfield College by then), c. 1887

Springfield College is known as the "Birthplace of Basketball" because basketball was created at the college by alumnus and faculty member James Naismith under the founding head of the Physical Education department Luther Gulick Jr. in 1891. Gulick is in the Naismith Memorial Basketball Hall of Fame, which is named for Naismith and located in Springfield to honor the location of its invention.

Alumnus William G. Morgan invented the game of volleyball.

Stagg Field serves as the institution's main athletic field; it was named after former coach, Amos Alonzo Stagg who briefly coached Springfield and went on to play a pivotal role in the development of modern football.

On October 19, 2017, Springfield College unveiled a one-of-a-kind intercollegiate and adaptive baseball field that resulted from a partnership between Springfield College and the Cal Ripken Sr. Foundation. On that day, Major League Baseball Hall of Famer Cal Ripken Jr. joined Springfield College President Mary-Beth Cooper for a ribbon-cutting ceremony on the new field. The name of the baseball field was changed from Berry-Allen Field to the Archie Allen Field.

The Springfield softball team appeared in one Women's College World Series in 1977.

The Springfield College women's gymnastics team won the first intercollegiate national championship in 1969 and three of the first four (1971 and 1972).

In 1940, Springfield was one of eight teams to make the 1940 NCAA basketball tournament, losing to eventual champion Indiana 48–24 in the regional semifinals held at Butler Fieldhouse in Indianapolis, Indiana.

In 2006 and 2007, the institution hosted the NCAA Division III Women's Basketball Final Four.

The men's volleyball team has six non-NCAA national titles in the now-defunct Molten Invitational championship, an event for NCAA Division III schools that ran from 1997 through 2011, and also won the first three NCAA Division III Men's Volleyball Championships in 2012 through 2014. All nine championships were won under Head Coach Charlie Sullivan. The Pride followed up with 4 more national championships appearances in 2015 through 2018. Winning 2 more titles in 2017 and 2018. Ten of the 11 championships were won under Head Coach Charlie Sullivan. The team would become national runners up in 2022 and 2025. In the 2026 season, Springfield defeated Carthage for their 6th national championship.

Men's sports	Women's sports
Baseball	Basketball
Basketball	Cross country
Cross country	Field hockey
Football	Gymnastics
Golf	Lacrosse
Gymnastics	Soccer
Lacrosse	Softball
Soccer	Swimming & diving
Swimming & diving	Tennis
Tennis	Track & field
Track & field	Volleyball
Volleyball	
Wrestling	

The Springfield College women's basketball team of 2004–2005, made the Elite Eight of the NCAA Division III basketball tournament. Springfield earned its second-ever at-large bid to the NCAA Division III Championship Tournament in February 2024 and made its eighth appearance in the national tournament to cap off the 2023–24 season. At the end of that season, Head Coach Naomi Graves and her staff were chosen as the New England Women's and Men's Athletic Conference Women's Basketball Coaching Staff of the Year.

Women's basketball has won several conference tournament championships, including the season of 2006. The 2023–24 team competed in the first round of the NCAA Division III championship.

Springfield College graduates Rusty Jones G '86 and Jon Torine '95 participated in Super Bowl XLI as the Head Strength and Conditioning coaches of the Chicago Bears and Indianapolis Colts, respectively. Steve Spagnuolo ’82 has served as a defensive coordinator six times in the Super Bowl with the Kansas City Chiefs and New York Giants, and three of those games resulted in Super Bowl victories.

The Springfield College women's field hockey team has won the NEWMAC (New England Women's and Men's Athletic Conference) title for five consecutive years (2004–2008), and competed in the NCAA Division III tournament in those five years as well.

The men's lacrosse team won six straight titles (2008–2013) in the now-defunct Pilgrim Lacrosse League, which has since been absorbed by the NEWMAC.

Springfield's women's swimming and diving team has won the NEWMAC Conference title for ten consecutive years (2001–2010) in the Division III Conference.

Springfield's men's soccer team were voted National College Champions by the Intercollegiate Soccer Football Association in 1946, 1947 and 1957. This was before the NCAA championship soccer tournament in 1959.

== Notable alumni and faculty ==
- Harold Amos, microbiologist and professor
- Rocky Aoki, founder of Benihana
- Peter Avdoulos, All-American diver who coached the Springfield College diving team for two decades, leading them to seven national championships
- Mark Banker, safeties coach for the Washington State Cougars football team
- Stanley F. Battle, American educator, author, civic activist, and former leader of North Carolina Agricultural and Technical State University, Coppin State University and Southern Connecticut State University, 1973
- Marilyn Bevans, the first Black American female to earn a medal at the Boston Marathon (1977)
- Vaughn Blanchard, 1912 Olympian in Track and Field and Baseball
- Rick Blangiardi, 15th mayor of Honolulu and former television executive
- Jeff Blatnick, 1984 Olympic gold medalist in Greco-Roman wrestling, 2015 UFC Hall of Fame inductee
- Roscoe Brown, flew 68 missions as part of the Tuskegee Airmen
- Kevin Cahill, head football coach at Lehigh University, 2023–2025, Yale University, 2026-present.
- Raymond Castellani, actor, activist on Los Angeles' Skid Row
- John Cena, professional wrestler and actor
- J. Howard Crocker, Canadian YMCA educator, and sports executive for the Amateur Athletic Union of Canada and the Canadian Olympic Committee; granted an honorary master's degree in physical education in 1916 for work in China and establishing the Far Eastern Championship Games
- Nancy Darsch, women's basketball coach in college, the WNBA, and the Olympics
- Tony DiCicco, head coach of USA Women's Soccer National Team 1994–1999, coach of the FIFA Women's Soccer 1999 Championship Team
- W. Dean Eastman, educator (graduate assistant track coach 1974–76, MSE 1976, CAGS 1977)
- John Forslund, TV play-by-play announcer for the Seattle Kraken of the NHL
- Richard F. Garber, Hall of Fame college lacrosse coach
- Nancy E. Gary, dean of Albany Medical College and executive vice president of the Uniformed Services University of the Health Sciences and dean of its F. Edward Hébert School of Medicine.
- Dave Gettleman, pro football executive, general manager of the New York Giants
- Wayne Granger, former Major League Baseball relief pitcher and National League saves leader in 1970
- Sally M. Hage, professor of psychology
- Charles Hapgood, professor of history, originator of the pseudoscientific cataclysmic pole shift hypothesis
- Don Ho, Hawaiian musician and entertainer (attended for one year)
- Dan Hunt, head football coach at Colgate University, 2014–2021
- Rusty Jones, strength and conditioning coach for the Chicago Bears
- Peter V. Karpovich, professor of physiology (1927–1947), director of health education (1947–1955), research professor of physiology (1955–1969); founder of the American College of Sports Medicine (ACSM).
- Leslie Mann, Major League Baseball outfielder and founder of the International Baseball Federation
- James A. McLane, American coach and athletic director.
- William G. Morgan, inventor of volleyball.
- James Naismith, Canadian faculty member, invented basketball while teaching at the college in 1891
- Max Nacewicz, professional football player
- Erin Pac, bronze medal winner in bobsled at the 2010 Vancouver Olympics
- Boris Pash, commanded the Alsos Mission during World War II
- Lee Patton, humanics advocate, launched Golden Age of Basketball at West Virginia University.
- Fernando Picó, historian, expert on the history of Puerto Rico
- Albert I. Prettyman, head coach of the United States Hockey Team at the Winter Olympics in Garmisch-Partenkirchen, Germany
- John Quinlan, model and actor, former professional wrestler
- Manuel Rivera-Ortiz, documentary photographer; attended classes at Springfield College as part of the Massachusetts Migrant Education summer program, where he was offered his first courses in photography and film development.
- Angela Salem, professional soccer player and coach
- Ted Shawn, adjunct faculty, 1932–1933; founder of the Denishawn Dance School and Jacob's Pillow Dance Festival and a key figure in establishing male modern dance
- Craig Shirley, political consultant and author, associated with Ronald Reagan
- Justine Siegal, baseball coach and sports educator
- Charles Silvia, International Hall of Fame swimming coach, Springfield College All-American swimmer and 1934 alumni who coached Springfield College swimming from 1937 to 1978, winning ten New England Interscholastic Team Championships.
- Stacy Sims, exercise physiologist, nutrition scientist, author, and women's health and fitness advocate.
- Steve Spagnuolo, former head coach of the National Football League's St. Louis Rams
- Amos Alonzo Stagg, head football coach, 1890–1891; later head of multiple national champion teams at the University of Chicago
- Sue Thomas, the first deaf person to work as an undercover specialist doing lip-reading of suspects for the Federal Bureau of Investigation
- Tom Waddell, physician and founder of the Gay Games
- Glenn Warner, president of National Soccer Coaches Association of America in 1953, head coach of the Naval Academy's men's soccer team from 1942 to 1975
- Scotty Whitelaw, former Commissioner of the Eastern College Athletic Conference
- Mike Woicik, football coach (1978–79) and strength and conditioning coach for several professional football teams
- Bill Yorzyk, physician and only USA swimming gold medalist in 1956 Olympics, 200 m butterfly
