= Lydia Wallace-Chavez =

Native American artist

Lydia Wallace-Chavez is a First Peoples artisan of the Unkechaug Nation and Kainai Nation. A New Yorker raised on the Poospatuck Reservation as the daughter of the chief of the Unkechaug people, she earned degrees in the arts while pursuing her interest in sculpture and three-dimensional art. After college she learned the art of making wampum beads and beadwork. She set up a company, Wampum Magic, with her husband, Christopher Chavez, and her father to produce culturally relevant crafts important to native peoples. Her work has been featured in museums and exhibits, shown on television, and commissioned by other tribes and organizations.

== Childhood and education ==
Born in Manhattan, New York in 1979 to Harry B Wallace and Willa Rosalyn Roberts. Lydia went to St Charles Boremeo, (a Catholic school) and spent all of her younger years in Brooklyn during the 80's. She moved with her father Chief Harry Wallace and step mother Margo Thunderbird to the Poospatuck Reservation and attended High School at CMHS. She attended the Institute of American Indian Arts, where she obtained an Associate's of Fine Arts degree in 2000 before obtaining a Bachelor's of Arts in 2002 from Alfred University.

== Career ==
After graduation, Courtney Anderson taught both Lydia and her husband Chris to carve wampum beads. In 2004, Wallace-Chavez moved to Denver, Colorado where she continued practicing various types of crafts, including the traditional water-focused shell and bead work of the Unkechaug. At the same time, she combined this tradition with her interest in three dimensional sculptures. She also started the company Wampum Magic with her husband and her father to feature their work, which has also been shown in the New York Historical Society. The Society put her Two Row wampum belt on display in March 2023, with the design representing the existence of two separate cultures working alongside one another. The belt is a reference to the original alliance between the Haudenosaunee and Dutch traders made in 1613.

Her other crafts have been featured in multiple museum exhibits, including the long-term Native New York exhibit at the National Museum of the American Indian as a fictionalized comic about her work involving wampum and her tribe, the New York State Museum, and the Long Island Wertheim Center. A wampum necklace named Heart Protector that Wallace-Chavez made in 2019 was also featured at the Queens Museum as a part of the Artist-In-Residence Tecumseh Ceaser exhibit. Several of her wampum belts have also been commissioned by the Seneca Nation and other private collectors, including for the Dakota Access Pipeline protests.

In 2022, Lydia participated in the New "Native Truths" exhibit at the Chicago Field Museum. The museum commissioned a 2 row wampum belt woven by Wallace-Chavez and other tools carvings and shells that were made by Christopher L Chavez.

== Personal life ==
Wallace-Chavez is married to Christopher Chavez, an Eastern Shoshone member, and they have a son.
