= Minnie Negoro =

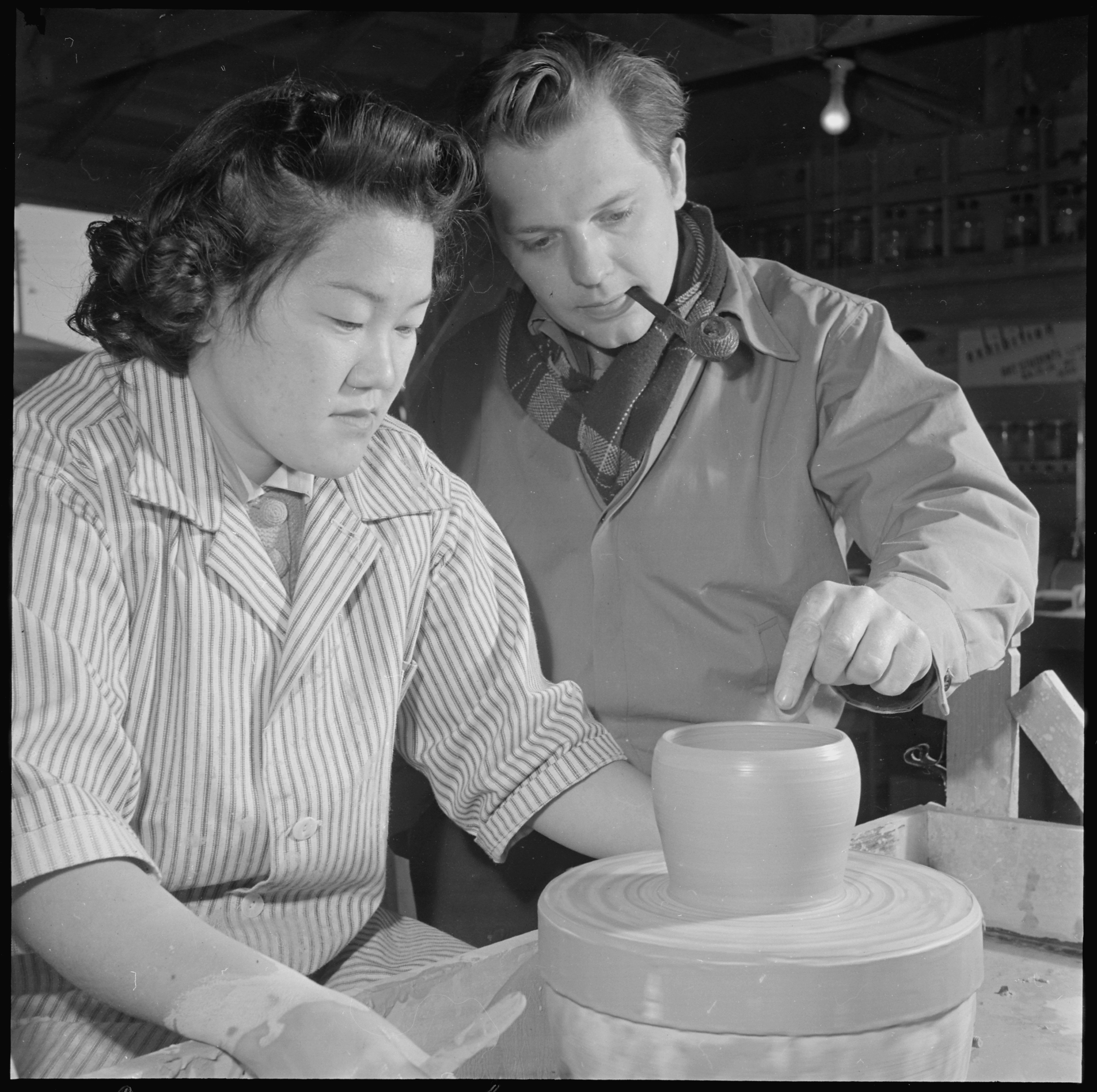
- Minnie Negoro and Daniel Rhodes at Heart Mountain Relocation Center in Wyoming, 1943
- Born: 27 April 1919; Los Angeles, California
- Died: May 1, 1998 (aged 79); Mason Island, Stonington, Connecticut

Academic background
- Education: University of California (BA); Alfred University (MFA)

Academic work
- Discipline: Ceramics
- Institutions: University of Connecticut; Rhode Island School of Design; New York University; Chouinard Art Institute

Signature
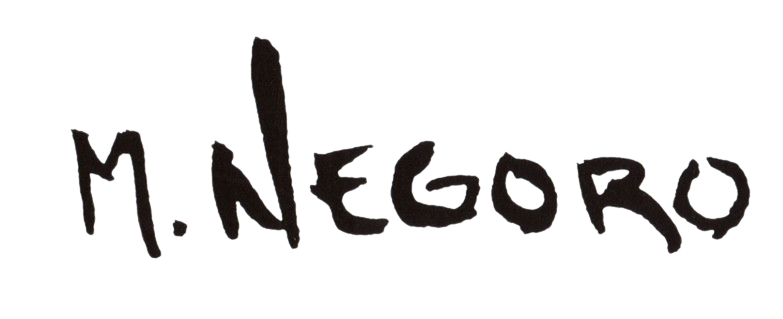

Minnie Negoro (27 April, 1919 - 1 May, 1998) was a Nisei Japanese-American ceramic artist and professor. During her professional career from 1945 to 1989 Negoro worked at a number of institutions as a ceramics researcher and potter. After receiving her Masters in Fine Arts in 1954 she went on to instruct at several universities, most notably the University of Connecticut, where she taught for 24 years from 1965 until her retirement in 1989.

Her ceramic work spanned a wide spectrum, including stoneware, porcelain, and earthenware. Like other members of the Nisei generation, she and her family were sent to a Japanese internment camp, where she met Daniel Rhodes, who became her lifelong mentor in ceramics.

== Education ==
Negoro earned a B.A. from the University of California in 1944, and then an M.F.A. from Alfred University's New York State College of Ceramics in 1950.

== Career ==
During World War II, Negoro learned pottery while in an internment camp in Wyoming. Her mentor was Daniel Rhodes.

Rhodes joined the War Relocation Authority in 1942 to teach ceramics. He was sent to Heart Mountain concentration camp, where he convinced the authorities to procure an industrial kiln to help inmates learn pottery for better employment opportunities when they leave the camp and to meet the dish ware needs of the ten camps.

However, following opposition from the National Brotherhood of Operative Potters and support from Rep. Earl Lewis, the plan was abandoned. Despite the situation, Rhodes took Negoro under his tutelage and later recommended that she enroll in Alfred University.

In December 1995, Negoro recounted her harrowing experiences in the internment camp to a reporter from The New London Day (now known as The Day), describing it as "a frightening place, with guard towers and MPs who were told to shoot anyone going outside or over the gate. It was a concentration camp. I just wanted to get the heck out of there and to get as far away from the West Coast as possible." She was able to leave the camp in 1944 when she departed to work at Glidden Pottery and eventually enrolled at Alfred University. According to a fellow Alfred student, Negoro was picked up from the camp upon her release by potter Laura Andresen and returned to Alfred University.

In 1965, she moved to the University of Connecticut where she established a program of study centered on ceramics. She would become a full professor at the University of Connecticut.

Her work is in the Smithsonian National Museum of Asian Art and the Everson Museum of Art, as well as in a number of private collections in Connecticut.

Negoro died in 1998.

== Honors and awards ==
In 1992 the William Benton Museum of Art at the University of Connecticut coordinated a retrospective honoring Negoro. In 2025 UConn professors Jason Chang and Hana Maruyama curated the exhibition, Minnie Negoro: From Heart Mountain to UConn, at the Benton.

She was awarded the Purchase Prize by Richard B. Gump at the 12th Ceramic National Exhibition in 1947. Her work was also a part of the Good Design exhibition at the Museum of Modern Art in New York between 1950 and 1952.
