= Hawaii Wing Civil Air Patrol =

Highest echelon of the Civil Air Patrol in Hawaii, United States

- Hawaii Wing of Civil Air Patrol

Associated branches
- United States Air Force

Command staff
- Commander: Col Dana McLaughlin
- Deputy Commander: Capt Darryl Ng
- Chief of Staff: Maj Pat Mulligan

Current statistics
- Cadets: 491
- Seniors: 352
- Website: hiwg.cap.gov
- Statistics as of

The Hawaii Wing (Hawaiian: Hawaii Kiwi) of Civil Air Patrol (CAP)(Puka Ahahui Hauoli) is the highest echelon of Civil Air Patrol in the state of Hawaii. Hawaii Wing headquarters is located in Honolulu, Hawaii. The Hawaii Wing consists of over 600 active cadet and adult members at over 10 locations across the state of Hawaii.

== Mission ==
Civil Air Patrol performs three primary missions: providing emergency services; offering cadet programs for youth; and providing aerospace education for both CAP members and the general public.

=== Emergency services ===
Civil Air Patrol provides emergency services, including search and rescue and disaster relief missions and assisting in humanitarian aid assignments across the state. The CAP also provides Air Force support through conducting light transport, communications support, and low-altitude route surveys. They also offer support on counter-drug missions with the Department of Homeland Security, Customs and Border Protection, etc. The Hawaii Wing performs tsunami and tropical cyclone warning missions on the ground as well as in the air mounting warning sirens on their Cessna's, as well as urban direction finding.

=== Cadet programs ===
Civil Air Patrol offers cadet programs for youth aged 12 to 21, which includes a sixteen step program offering training in aerospace education, leadership training, physical fitness and moral leadership. The Hawaii Wing actively participates in many public events, often volunteering with the help of cadets inside the community. Currently, there is 1 Cadet Squadron located at Maryknoll School in Honolulu.

=== Aerospace education ===
Civil Air Patrol provides aerospace education by offering training to the members of the CAP, and offering workshops for youth throughout the nation through schools and public aviation events. Furthermore, cadets are offered 10 orientation flights throughout their career within CAP often flying Cessna's and Blanik gliding aircraft.

== Organization ==
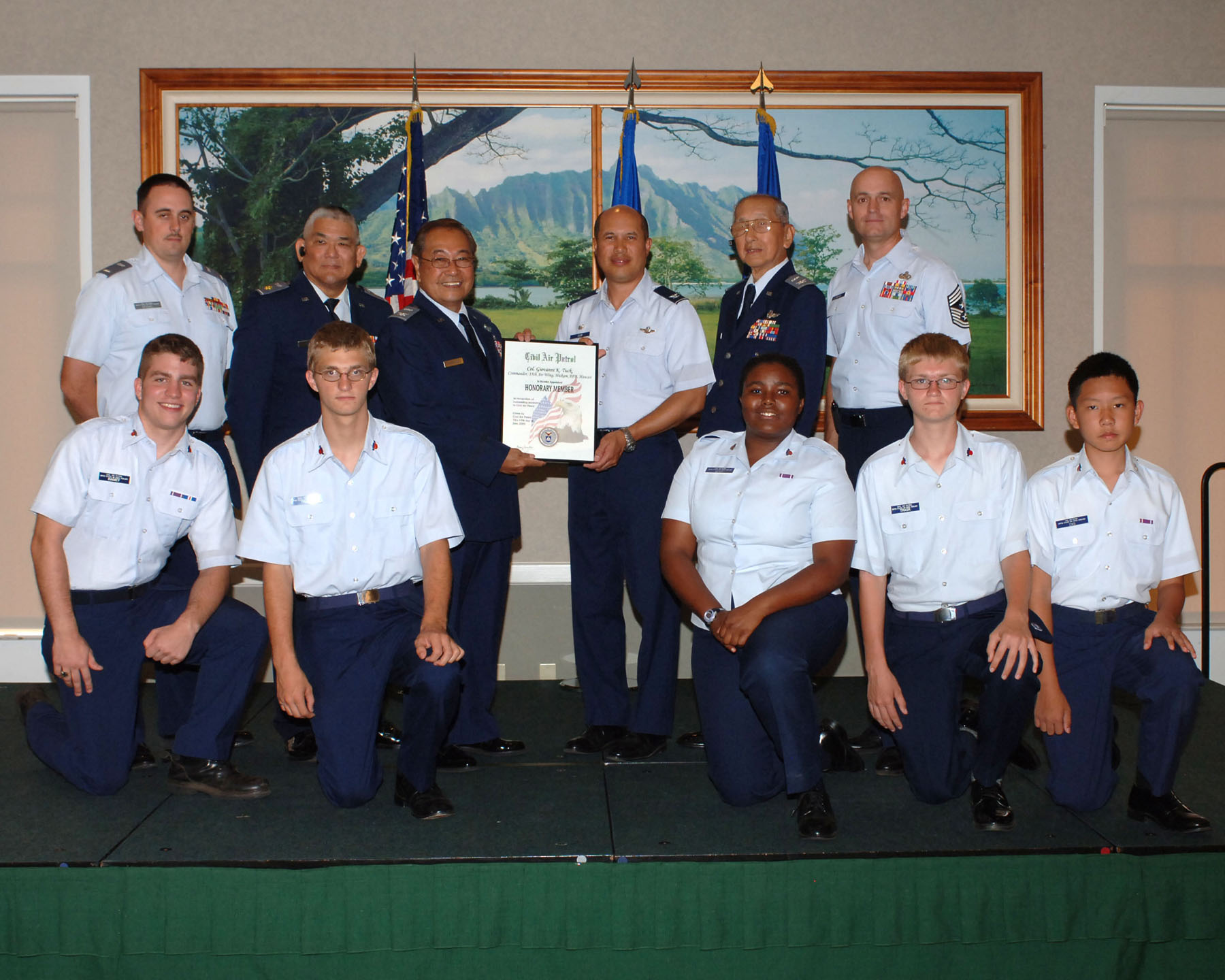
Members of the Hawaii Wing, Civil Air Patrol, confer the "Honorary CAP Membership," to Colonel Giovanni Tuck, 15th Airlift Wing commander.

The Hawaii Wing maintains its headquarters in Honolulu and has 10 squadrons located across the state. Furthermore, the Hawaii Wing Civil Air Patrol is Headquartered near Lagoon Drive off the Eastern end of Daniel K. Inouye International Airport.

Squadrons of the Hawaii Wing
| Designation | Squadron Name | Location | Notes |
|---|---|---|---|
| PCR-HI-077 (77th) | St Louis Crusader Composite Squadron | Honolulu | Saint Louis School |
| PCR-HI-066 (66th) | Hickam Composite Squadron | Hickam Air Force Base | JBPHH |
| PCR-HI-078 (78th) | Honolulu Senior Squadron | Honolulu | *no cadets |
| PCR-HI-073 (73rd) | Kauai Composite Squadron | Lihue | |
| PCR-HI-060 (60th) | Kona Composite Squadron | Kailua-Kona | |
| PCR-HI-043 (43rd) | Lyman Field Composite Squadron | Hilo | |
| PCR-HI-030 (30th) | Maryknoll Cadet Squadron | Honolulu | Maryknoll School |
| PCR-HI-057 (57th) | Maui Composite Squadron | Kahului | |
| PCR-HI-075 (75th) | West Oahu Composite Squadron | Kapolei | Barbers Point |
| PCR-HI-009 (9th) | Wheeler Composite Squadron | Schofield Barracks | Wheeler Army Airfield |
| PCR-HI-0079 (79th) | Windward Composite Squadron | Windward Community Collage | Kaneohe |
