= Destination: Deep Space =

2019 FIRST Robotics Competition game

- Year: 2019

Season Information
- Number of teams: 3,790
- Number of regionals: 62
- Number of district events: 111
- Championship location: Houston; George R. Brown Convention Center; Minute Maid Park; Detroit; Cobo Center; Ford Field

FIRST Championship Awards
- Chairman's Award winner: Houston; 1902 - "Exploding Bacon"; Detroit; 1816 - "The Green Machine"
- Woodie Flowers Award winner: Allen Gregory IV - Team 3847
- Founder's Award winner: Raj Subramaniam - FedEx
- Champions: Houston; 973 - "Greybots"; 1323 - "MadTown Robotics"; 5026 - "Iron Panthers"; 4201 - "The Vitruvian Bots"; Detroit; 3707 - "Brighton TechnoDogs"; 217 - "ThunderChickens"; 4481 - "Team Rembrandts"; 1218 - "SCH Vulcan Robotics"

Links
- Website: Official website

Destination: Deep Space, stylized as DESTINATION: DEEP SPACE and officially known as Destination: Deep Space Presented By The Boeing Company, is the FIRST Robotics Competition game for the 2019 season. It involves two alliances of three teams each, with each team controlling a robot and performing specific tasks on a field to score points. The game centers around an outer space theme involving two alliances consisting of three teams each competing to place poly-carbonate hatch panels and orange rubber balls or "cargo" on rockets and cargo ships before returning to their HAB platform to climb at the end of the match.

== Kickoff ==
The kickoff event occurred on January 5, 2019. The kickoff video was styled after a rocket launch, with information about FIRST and the game reveal itself linked to specific points in the countdown. The event was livestreamed starting at 10:30 AM Eastern Time, with many teams attending their own local kickoff events.

== Field ==
Destination: Deep Space is played on a 27 ft (823 cm) by 54 ft (1646 cm) field that is covered in grey carpet. The field is bounded by transparent polycarbonate guardrails on the longer sides and the Alliance Station walls on the shorter side. The field features two types of zones, one for each alliance. The hab zone contains robots at the start and end of each match, while the alliance station is where drivers control their robots. For the first time, a Google Cardboard headset was included in the kickoff kit to allow teams to view a virtual field.

=== Alliance Station ===
Each alliance has their own Alliance Station that is positioned at one of the ends of the field. The Alliance Station is where drivers control their robots, human players deliver game pieces to robots, and coaches give advice to their team members. Each alliance station features two game piece holding areas on either side of their driver stations.

=== Depots ===
Depots are placed on the field next to the alliance stations, with two per alliance. Before the match starts, alliances are permitted to stage cargo in their respective depots for robots to retrieve during the match.

=== Sandstorm ===
The sandstorm is installed above each alliance's alliance station, and is used to block the drive team's vision of the field during the sandstorm period. Once that period ends, the sandstorm retracts in order to allow drivers to see the field for the remainder of the match.

=== Loading Stations ===
Each alliance station features two loading stations near the edges of the alliance station. Human players use the loading stations to deliver hatch panels and cargo to robots through a chute, where they can be collected by a waiting robot.

=== Scoring Areas ===
==== Rockets ====
There are four rockets on the field, two per alliance. Each rocket features three levels, made up of two bays, where game pieces can be scored. Two hatch panels and two pieces of cargo can be scored on each level.

==== Cargo Ships ====
There are two cargo ships placed in the middle of the field, one per alliance. As with the rockets, each cargo ship features bays where hatch panels and cargo can be scored. Each cargo ship has eight bays, each capable of holding one hatch cover and one cargo.

==== HAB Platforms ====
Each alliance controls one hab platform near the alliance station wall. Robots start the match at their alliance's respective hab platform, and must return to the same platform at the end of the match. Each hab platform has three levels, and parking on a higher level at the end of the match earns the alliance more points.

== Gameplay and Scoring ==
=== Scoring Elements ===
There are two scoring elements in Destination: Deep Space; hatch panels and cargo. Hatch panels are 19 in. (~48 cm) diameter polycarbonate toroids, and cargo is represented by orange 13 in. (~33 cm) playground balls.

Before the match begins, teams may discuss and select their robots’ starting formation (i.e., which HAB level they will begin on), as well as which game pieces they will preload into the cargo ship. Each of the six side slots may be loaded with either a cargo ball or a ‘null’ hatch panel

=== Sandstorm Period ===
For the 2019 season, the sandstorm period is the first 15 seconds of the match and replaces the autonomous period, which had been used in many previous FRC games. Robots start the match at their respective HAB platforms, fully supported by HAB platform level one or two. The Sandstorm is a black curtain that begins down to obscure players’ vision of the field. During the period, robots can act solely on pre-programmed instructions, therefore acting autonomously, or under control of their drivers with the optional aid of a vision system mounted on the robot (as they are unable to directly see the field due to the Sandstorm). Robots can earn points in a variety of ways. For each robot that fully crosses the HAB line during the sandstorm period, the alliance earns three points (Sandstorm Bonus 1) if the robot started on HAB platform level one and six points (Sandstorm Bonus 2) if the robot started on level two. Robots are also able to earn points for scoring hatch panels and cargo on their alliance's rockets and cargo ship. As these actions carry the same point value as if they occurred in the tele-operated period (or teleop), they will be further discussed in that section. After the 15 second sandstorm period expires, the curtain retracts to grant players vision of the field, and teleop begins.

Electromagnets inside the cargo ship release after this period ends, releasing any cargo not secured by hatch panels. Therefore, there is some risk in selecting to load the cargo ship with cargo balls over null hatch panels - the null hatch panels will immediately hold a cargo ball, for a total value of (0 + 2 =) 2 points, however, a cargo ball secured by a hatch panel before the end of the sandstorm phase is worth a total value of (3 + 2 =) 5 points.

Scoring is further described in the Scoring Summary section.

=== Tele-operated Period ===
After the sandstorm period ends, the tele-op period begins, which lasts for 135 seconds. Drivers control their robot from their Driver Station and human players may deliver game pieces to the robots. During this period, as in autonomous, every hatch panel scored on a rocket or cargo ship will earn two points for the alliance. Additionally, scoring cargo into a rocket or cargo ship will earn three points for the alliance. Hatch Panels must be scored before cargo (as the cargo will simply roll out), unless there are Hatch Panels pre-installed on the bay.

==== Endgame ====
The last 30 seconds of the teleop period is called the endgame. During this time, robots can earn additional points by climbing back onto their alliance's HAB platform. A robot ending the match on HAB level one will earn the alliance 3 points, while ending the match on level two will earn 6 points and ending the match on level three will earn 12 points.

=== Special Scoring ===
In tournament play, teams are ranked by their Ranking Score, or the average number of Ranking Points they achieve per match. Ranking Points are earned through both winning matches and completing secondary objectives. Therefore, it is more beneficial to focus on accumulating as many ranking points as possible, rather than simply winning every match.

An alliance can earn a ranking point during the qualification rounds by accumulating a total of 15 points at the end of the match through climbing the HAB, known as the HAB docking bonus. An alliance can also earn a ranking point by completing one rocket, which entails scoring two hatch panels and two pieces of cargo on each of its three levels.

A foul will result in 3 points being credited to the opposing alliance, and a technical foul will result in 10 points being credited to the opposing alliance.

=== Scoring Summary ===
Action	Sandstorm	Teleop	Ranking Points (in Qualification)
Sandstorm Bonus (Level One)	3 points		
Sandstorm Bonus (Level Two)	6 points		
Hatch Panel	2 points	2 points	
Cargo	3 points	3 points	
Hab Climb Bonus (Level One)		3 points	
Hab Climb Bonus (Level Two)		6 points	
Hab Climb Bonus (Level Three)		12 points	
Hab Docking			1 RP
One Complete Rocket			1 RP
Foul	3 points to opposing alliance	3 points to opposing alliance	
Tech Foul	10 points to opposing alliance	10 points to opposing alliance	
Win			2 RP
Tie			1 RP

== Events ==
The competition season for Destination: Deep Space is divided into seven weeks, with many events occurring simultaneously during each week. After Week 7, teams that have qualified compete in the FIRST Championship, held over two weeks in Houston and Detroit. Only regional and district championship events are shown.

=== Week 1 ===
Event	Location	Date	Champions
Palmetto Regional	Myrtle Beach, South Carolina	February 27 – March 2	4020 Cyber Tribe, 4451 ROBOTZ Garage, 5022 Rat Rod Robotics
Festival de Robotique à Montréal Regional	Montreal, Québec	February 27 – March 2	3990 Tech for Kids, 3986 Express-O, 3985 Sonic Howl
Orange County Regional	Costa Mesa, California	February 27 – March 2	330 The Beach Bots, 973 Greybots, 597 The Wolverines
FIRST in Michigan (FIM) Gibraltar Event	Gibraltar, Michigan	February 28 – March 2	1023 Bedford Express, 1718 The Fighting Pi, 6081 Digital Dislocators
FIM Kettering University Event #1	Flint, Michigan	February 28 – March 2	27 Team RUSH, 3542 S.P.E.E.D., 5150 Hybrid Hornets
New England (NE) Granite State Event	Salem, New Hampshire	February 28 – March 2	1519 Mechanical Mayhem, 5687 The Outliers, 7416 Northern Horizons
FIM Southfield Event	Southfield, Michigan	February 28 – March 2	33 Killer Bees, 3538 RoboJackets, 94 The TechnoJays
Del Mar Regional	Del Mar, California	February 28 – March 3	4414 HighTide, 3647 Millennium Falcons, 5526 Type C - Peñoles
Peachtree (PCH) Gainesville Event	Gainesville, Georgia	March 1 – 3	6919 The Commodores, 1747 Harrison Boiler Robotics, 6705 WildCat 5e, 4112 EagleBots
Ontario (ONT) Durham College Event	Oshawa, Ontario, Canada	March 1 – 3	2200 MMRambotics, 610 Crescent Coyotes, 4783 The RoboRavens
FIRST Mid-Atlantic (FMA) Hatboro-Horsham Event	Horsham, Pennsylvania	March 1 – 3	4454 SLAM Robotics, 5684 Iron Mechs, 5401 Fightin' Robotic Owls
Chesapeake (CHS) Richmond VA Event	Glen Allen, Virginia	March 1 – 3	346 RoboHawks, 1262 the STAGS, 539 Titan Robotics, 6882 Fahrenheit Robotics
CHS Haymarket VA Event	Haymarket, Virginia	March 1 – 3	612 Chantilly Robotics, 2363 Triple Helix Robotics, 1731 Fresta Valley Robotics Club
FIRST in Texas (FIT) Austin Event	Austin, Texas	March 1 – 3	2468 Team Appreciate, 624 CRyptonite, 3834 Crab-bots
Pacific Northwest (PNW) Mount Vernon Event	Mount Vernon, Washington	March 1 – 3	118 Robonauts, 3847 Spectrum -△◅, 5047 DV CONQUISTABOTS
İstanbul Regional	Batı Ataşehir, İstanbul, Turkey	March 1 – 4	2910 Jack in the Bot, 2930 Sonic Squirrels, 4513 Circuit Breakers

=== Week 2 ===
Event	Location	Date	Champions
Israel (ISR) Event #1	Haifa, Israel	March 4 – 5	4338 Falcons, 1574 MisCar, 5135 Black Unicorns
Bosphorus Regional	Batı Ataşehir, İstanbul, Turkey	March 5 – 7	5883 Spice Gears, 6838 X-SHARC, 7761 Eagle Tech
ISR Event #2	Haifa, Israel	March 6 – 7	3339 BumbleB, 3075 Ha-Dream Team, 5990 TRIGON
New York Tech Valley Regional	Troy, New York	March 6 – 9	20 The Rocketeers, 2791 Shaker Robotics, 7651 Bethlehem Eagles
Miami Valley Regional	Dayton, Ohio	March 6 – 9	302 The Dragons, 3324 The Metrobots, 5724 Spartan Robotics, 1317 Digital Fusion
Arkansas Rock City Regional	Little Rock, Arkansas	March 6 – 9	3039 Wildcat Robotics, 2992 The S.S. Prometheus, 2080 Torbotics
Midwest Regional	Chicago, Illinois	March 6 – 9	48 Team E.L.I.T.E., 111 WildStang, 2830 Riverside RoboTigers
Lake Superior Regional	Duluth, Minnesota	March 6 – 9	3750 Gator Robotics, 3102 Tech-No-Tigers, 5690 SubZero Robotics
Northern Lights Regional	Duluth, Minnesota	March 6–9	2052 KnightKrawler, 525 Swartdogs, 3630 Stampede
Regional Monterrey	Monterrey, Nuevo León, Mexico	March 6 – 9	3478 PrepaTec - LamBot, 4635 PrepaTec - Botbusters, 6444 PrepaTec Chihuahua- Sigma Robotics
Oklahoma Regional	Oklahoma City, Oklahoma	March 6 – 9	1619 Up-A-Creek Robotics, 4005 Hostile Gato Robotics, 6026 Tiger Strike
Canadian Pacific Regional	Victoria, British Columbia, Canada	March 6 – 9	359 Hawaiian Kids, 7498 Wingus & Dingus, 7796 Breaker Robotics
Central Valley Regional	Fresno, California	March 6 – 9	1323 MadTown Robotics, 1678 Citrus Circuits, 7663 Sleuth Robotics
San Diego Regional	San Diego, California	March 6 – 9	987 HIGHROLLERS, 3647 Millennium Falcons, 6995 NOMAD
PCH Dalton Event	Dalton, Georgia	March 7 – 9	4026 Decatur Robotics, 2974 Walton Robotics, 7883 CCHS RazorBots
FIM Belleville Event	Belleville, Michigan	March 7 – 9	5567 Code Red Robotics, 3656 Dexter Dreadbots, 7656 MC Hammers
FIM Kettering University Event #2	Flint, Michigan	March 7 – 9	3667 Mecanum Knights, 494 Martians, 6093 Unplugged
FIM Lakeview Event	Battle Creek, Michigan	March 7 – 9	2054 Tech Vikes, 5205 FullMetal-Jackets, 7144 NexTech Hydra
FIM Milford Event	Milford, Michigan	March 7 – 9	67 The HOT Team, 3707 TechnoDogs, 5562 AnchorBots
FIM St. Joseph Event	St. Joseph, Michigan	March 7 – 9	4325 RoboRangers, 5927 Globetrotters, 288 The RoboDawgs
FIT Amarillo Event	Amarillo, Texas	March 7 – 9	148 Robowranglers, 3310 Black Hawk Robotics, 2657 Team Thundercats
PNW Wilsonville Event	Wilsonville, Oregon	March 7 – 9	6443 AEMBOT, 2990 Hotwire, 5085 LakerBots
NE Waterbury Event	Waterbury, Connecticut	March 8 – 10	1676 The Pascack PI-oneers, 230 Gaelhawks, 3654 TechTigers
Indiana (IN) St. Joseph Event	Mishawaka, Indiana	March 8 – 10	3940 CyberTooth, 4103 Roborioles, 5484 Career Academy Robotics - Wolf Pack
NE SE Mass Event	Bridgewater, Massachusetts	March 8 – 10	78 AIR STRIKE, 2168 Aluminum Falcons, 2523 Tech Storm
CHS Bethesda MD Event	Bethesda, Maryland	March 8 – 10	1885 Comet Robotics, 449 The Blair Robot Project, 2849 Ursa Major
FIRST North Carolina (FNC) Wake County Event	Holly Springs, North Carolina	March 8 – 10	5511 Cortechs Robotics, 4561 TerrorBytes, 4291 AstroBots
FMA Mount Olive Event	Flanders, New Jersey	March 8 – 10	2577 Pingry Robotics, 222 Tigertrons, 6943 Blue Bears
ONT Humber College Event	Toronto, Ontario, Canada	March 8 – 10	1114 Simbotics, 3683 Team DAVE, 771 SWAT
FMA Westtown Event	West Chester, Pennsylvania	March 8 – 10	4342 Demon Robotics, 1640 Sab-BOT-age, 2191 Flux Core
FIT San Antonio Event	San Antonio, Texas	March 8 – 10	3035 Droid Rage, 7621 Iron Rangers, 3240 Team Orion
PNW Auburn Mountainview Event	Auburn, Washington	March 8 – 10	948 NRG (Newport Robotics Group), 3574 HIGH TEKERZ, 4060 Bearcat Robotics
Southern Cross Regional	Sydney Olympic Park, New South Wales, Australia	March 9 – 12	5985 Project Bucephalus, 4613 Barker Redbacks, 7583 Embers

=== Week 3 ===
Event	Location	Date	Champions
ISR Event #3	Tel Aviv-Yafo, Israel	March 11 – 12	3034 Galileo, 2212 The Spikes, 5654 Phoenix
ISR Event #4	Tel Aviv-Yafo, Israel	March 13 – 14	1937 Elysium, 5987 Galaxia in memory of David Zohar, 4590 GreenBlitz
Orlando Regional	Orlando, Florida	March 13 – 16	386 Team Voltage, 233 The Pink Team, 1251 TechTigers Robotics
Finger Lakes Regional	Rochester, New York	March 13 – 16	870 TEAM R. I. C. E., 3015 Ranger Robotics, 271 Mechanical Marauders
Central New York Regional	Utica, New York	March 13 – 16	2791 Shaker Robotics, 195 CyberKnights, 395 2 Train Robotics
Rocket City Regional	Huntsville, Alabama	March 13 – 16	4451 ROBOTZ Garage, 364 Team Fusion, 7072 O.G.R.E. (Opelika's Greatest Robotics Engineers
Heartland Regional	Olathe, Kansas	March 13 – 16	935 RaileRobotics, 6907 The G.O.A.T., 5126 Electromagnetic Panthers (EMP)
St. Louis Regional	St. Louis, Missouri	March 13 – 16	1501 Team THRUST, 4500 RoboHounds, 6391 Ursuline Robotics
Great Northern Regional	Grand Forks, North Dakota	March 13 – 16	5172 Gators, 3750 Gator Robotics, 7048 Red River Rage
Regional de la Ciudad de Mexico	Mexico City, Mexico	March 13 – 16	3478 PrepaTec - LamBot, 4775 Aztech Robotics, 5887 PrepaTec-IMPERATOR
Arizona North Regional	Flagstaff, Arizona	March 13 – 16	118 Robonauts, 2478 Westwood Robotics, 5059 The Midnight Cicadas
PCH Albany Event	Albany, Georgia	March 14 – 16	832 OSCAR, 6829 Ignite Robotics, 7499 Stallion Robotics
FIM Center Line Event	Center Line, Michigan	March 14 – 16	33 Killer Bees, 1025 Impi Warriors, 5555 Spartans
FIM Detroit Event	Detroit, Michigan	March 14 – 16	4680 AzTech Eagles, 3641 The Flying Toasters, 2224 RoboPhoenix
FIM Gull Lake Event	Richland, Michigan	March 14 – 16	3538 RoboJackets, 5152 Alotobots, 6120 CyberStangs
FIM Muskegon Event	Muskegon, Michigan	March 14 – 16	4004 M.A.R.S. Rovers, 3546 Buc'n'Gears, 3458 Code Blue
ONT Ryerson University Event	Toronto, Ontario, Canada	March 14 – 16	5406 Celt-X, 188 Blizzard, 7520 Team MineKee
FIM Kingsford Event	Kingsford, Michigan	March 14 – 16	6569 Gladiators, 245 Adambots, 1596 The Instigators
FIT Channelview Event	Channelview, Texas	March 14 – 16	5892 Energy HEROs, 624 CRyptonite, 3834 Crab-bots
FIT Plano Event	Plano, Texas	March 14 – 16	5431 Titan Robotics, 2714 ♨️ BBQ ♨️, 4192 Jaguar Robotics
PNW Clackamas Academy Event	Oregon City, Oregon	March 14 – 16	3674 CloverBots, 3673 C.Y.B.O.R.G. Seagulls, 3636 Generals
PNW SunDome Event	Yakima, Washington	March 14 – 16	2910 Jack in the Bot, 5803 Apex Robotics, 2926 Robo Sparks
Los Angeles North Regional	Valencia, California	March 14 – 17	1868 Space Cookies, 6803 HAI-Panda, 2659 RoboWarriors
San Francisco Regional	San Francisco, California	March 14 – 17	971 Spartan Robotics, 254 The Cheesy Poofs, 5700 SOTA Cyberdragons
South Pacific Regional	Sydney Olympic Park, New South Wales, Australia	March 15 – 17	6034 EAGLE, 6386 Guangzhou research robot club, 5584 ICRobotics
NE North Shore Event	Reading, Massachusetts	March 15 – 17	4761 The Robockets, 95 Grasshoppers, 5735 Control Freaks
CHS Owings Mills MD Event	Owings Mills, Maryland	March 15 – 17	836 The RoboBees, 614 Night Hawks, 3748 Ragnarok Robotics
FNC Guilford County Event	Gibsonville, North Carolina	March 15 – 17	2059 The Hitchhikers, 2655 The Flying Platypi, 6729 RobCoBots
NE Southern NH Event	Bedford, New Hampshire	March 15 – 17	133 B.E.R.T., 319 Big Bad Bob, 885 Ro-bovines, 6324 The Blue Devils
FMA Bridgewater-Raritan Event	Bridgewater, New Jersey	March 15 – 17	56 R.O.B.B.E., 1403 Cougar Robotics, 4285 Camo-Bots
ONT Georgian College Event	Barrie, Ontario, Canada	March 15 – 17	1305 Ice Cubed, 4476 W.A.F.F.L.E.S., 781 Kinetic Knights
FMA Springside Chestnut Hill Academy Event	Philadelphia, Pennsylvania	March 15 – 17	5404 Gearaffes, 2168 Aluminum Falcons, 1495 Red Devils
CHS Portsmouth VA Event	Portsmouth, Virginia	March 15 – 17	1599 CircuiTree, 1610 ⛴ Blackwater Robotics ⛴, 6882 Fahrenheit Robotics

=== Week 4 ===
Event	Location	Date	Champions
Iowa Regional	Cedar Falls, Iowa	March 20 – 23	5013 Trobots, 967 Iron Lions, 6455 The Coded Collective
Bayou Regional	Kenner, Louisiana	March 20 – 23	364 Team Fusion, 1421 Team CHAOS, 3991 KnightVision
Greater Pittsburgh Regional	California, Pennsylvania	March 20 – 23	48 Team E.L.I.T.E., 3324 The Metrobots, 5842 Royal Robotics
Regional Laguna	Torreón, Coahuila, Mexico	March 20 – 23	4775 Aztech Robotics, 4635 PrepaTec - Botbusters, 7725 PrepaTec - NUTS & VOLTS
Colorado Regional	Denver, Colorado	March 20 – 23	1619 Up-A-Creek Robotics, 1410 The Kraken, 4068 Bearbotics
Central Illinois Regional	Peoria, Illinois	March 20 – 23	1756 Argos, 2481 Roboteers, 1781 Lindblom Electric Eagles
Los Angeles Regional	Los Angeles, California	March 20 – 23	5199 Robot Dolphins From Outer Space, 330 The Beach Bots, 2710 JetStream
Greater Kansas City Regional	Kansas City, Missouri	March 20 – 23	5801 CTC Inspire, 1730 Team Driven, 2357 System Meltdown, 1785 Blue Springs Robocats
Sacramento Regional	Davis, California	March 20 – 23	1323 MadTown Robotics, 1678 Citrus Circuits, 3859 Wolfpack Robotics
PCH Columbus Event	Columbus, Georgia	March 21 – 23	1414 IHOT, 2974 Walton Robotics, 1795 Carver Clutch
FIM Alpena Event #1	Alpena, Michigan	March 21 – 23	2075 Enigma Robotics, 2137 The Oxford RoboCats, 6573 Alanson Viking Robotics
FIM Jackson Event	Jackson, Michigan	March 21 – 23	1481 The Riveters, 4362 CSPA Gems, 7501 Golden Gears
FIM Lincoln Event	Ypsilanti, Michigan	March 21 – 23	5853 FEAR The Termigators, 5530 The Greenhills Lawnmowers, 7660 The Byting Irish
FIM Midland Event	Midland, Michigan	March 21 – 23	5509 Like a Boss, 3770 BlitzCreek, 3414 Hackbots
FIM West Michigan Event	Allendale, Michigan	March 21 – 23	5927 Globetrotters, 2474 Excel, 5173 Fennville RoboHawks
ONT University of Waterloo Event	Waterloo, Ontario, Canada	March 21 – 23	2056 OP Robotics, 3683 Team DAVE, 5672 First Nations-STEM
FIT Greenville Event	Greenville, Texas	March 21 – 23	2468 Team Appreciate, 3310 Black Hawk Robotics, 7708 Tiger Nation
PNW West Valley Event	Spokane, Washington	March 21 – 23	2046 Bear Metal, 2147 CHUCK, 4104 Cheney Circuit Cyclone
Hudson Valley	Suffern, New York	March 21 – 24	20 The Rocketeers, 1796 RoboTigers, 6401 8-bit RAMs
Monterey Bay	Seaside, California	March 21 – 24	1671 Buchanan Bird Brains, 6814 Ellipse, 702 Bagel Bytes, 2643 Dark Matter
IN Tippecanoe Event	Lafayette, Indiana	March 22 – 24	7457 suPURDUEper Robotics, 4272 Maverick Robotics, 3494 The Quadrangles
NE Greater Boston Event	Revere, Massachusetts	March 22 – 24	5687 The Outliers, 125 NUTRONs, 1307 Robosaints
NE Western NE Event	Springfield, Massachusetts	March 22 – 24	176 Aces High, 195 CyberKnights, 6328 Mechanical Advantage
CHS Oxon Hill MD Event	Oxon Hill, Maryland	March 22 – 24	612 Chantilly Robotics, 1418 Vae Victis, 6543 pumaTECH
FNC UNC Asheville Event	Asheville, North Carolina	March 22 – 24	5190 Falcon Fury, 2655 The Flying Platypi, 2640 HOTBOTZ
FMA Seneca Event	Tabernacle, New Jersey	March 22 – 24	834 SparTechs, 1640 Sab-BOT-age, 6327 The Fighting Gophers
ONT York University Event	North York, Ontario, Canada	March 22 – 24	6140 SMT Titans - The 'Tita'BOTS, 854 Iron Bears, 6141 O'Connor Robotics
NE Rhode Island Event	Smithfield, Rhode Island	March 22 – 24	78 AIR STRIKE, 2168 Aluminum Falcons, 4796 Cyber Dragons
FIT Del Rio Event	Del Rio, Texas	March 22 – 24	6377 Howdy Bots, 7521 ULTIMATE Robotics, 7088 Somerset Robodogs
PNW Glacier Peak Event	Snohomish, Washington	March 22 – 24	2910 Jack in the Bot, 2930 Sonic Squirrels, 1294 Pack of Parts
SBPLI Long Island Regional #1	Hempstead, New York	March 24 – 27	2368 Rebel Robotics, 1468 Hicksville J-Birds, 6911 SO BOTZ
SBPL2 Long Island Regional #2	Hempstead, New York	March 24 – 27	870 TEAM R. I. C. E., 1796 RoboTigers, 3624 ThunderColts

=== Week 5 ===
Event	Location	Date	Champions
Smoky Mountains Regional	Knoxville, Tennessee	March 27 – 30	4265 Secret City Wildbots, 2614 Mountaineer Area RoboticS (MARS), 2556 RadioActive Roaches
South Florida Regional	West Palm Beach, Florida	March 27 – 30	179 Children of the Swamp, 180 S.P.A.M., 5872 WiredCats
Wisconsin Regional	Milwaukee, Wisconsin	March 27 – 30	6574 Ferradermis, 1259 Paradigm Shift, 1091 Oriole Assault
Buckeye Regional	Cleveland, Ohio	March 27 – 30	4028 The Beak Squad, 48 Team E.L.I.T.E., 4145 WorBots
Utah Regional	West Valley City, Utah	March 27 – 30	3478 PrepaTec - LamBot, 971 Spartan Robotics, 4738 Patribots
Hawaii Regional	Honolulu, Hawai'i	March 27 – 30	368 Team Kika Mana, 359 Hawaiian Kids, 5515 Blue Power Robotics
Idaho Regional	Nampa, Idaho	March 27 – 30	3647 Millennium Falcons, 5012 Gryffingear, 1566 AMMOKNIGHTS
Ventura Regional	Ventura, California	March 27 – 30	5199 Robot Dolphins From Outer Space, 4414 HighTide, 6934 Scorps
Las Vegas Regional	Las Vegas, Nevada	March 27 – 30	987 HIGHROLLERS, 842 Falcon Robotics, 7425 Green Valley Robotics
Minnesota 10,000 Lakes Regional	Minneapolis, Minnesota	March 27 – 30	5172 Gators, 2052 KnightKrawler, 3026 Orange Crush Robotics
Minnesota North Star	Minneapolis, Minnesota	March 27 – 30	1816 "The Green Machine", 2549 Millerbots, 3082 Chicken Bot Pie
IN Center Grove Event	Greenwood, Indiana	March 28 – 30	7457 suPURDUEper Robotics, 868 TechHOUNDS, 1741 Red Alert
FIM Alpena Event #2	Alpena, Michigan	March 28 – 30	3538 RoboJackets, 33 Killer Bees, 7084 Hillman Pyrobots
FIM East Kentwood Event	Kentwood, Michigan	March 28 – 30	2054 Tech Vikes, 1918 NC GEARS, 4956 RoboSharks
FIM Marysville Event	Marysville, Michigan	March 28 – 30	3452 GreengineerZ, 217 ThunderChickens, 7192 Blue Thunderneers
FIM Shepherd Event	Shepherd, Michigan	March 28 – 30	1188 Ravens, 3572 Wavelength, 6963 Blood Sweat and Gears
FIM Troy Event	Troy, Michigan	March 28 – 30	51 Wings of Fire, 1718 The Fighting Pi, 4768 Cody "The Green Comet"
ONT North Bay Event	North Bay, Ontario, Canada	March 28 – 30	1305 Ice Cubed, 4917 Sir Lancerbot, 4519 King's Robotics
ONT Windsor Essex Great Lakes Event	Windsor, Ontario, Canada	March 28 – 30	1114 Simbotics, 1285 The Biggest Birds, 7480 Machine Mavericks
FIT Pasadena Event	Pasadena, Texas	March 28 – 30	118 Robonauts, 231 High Voltage, 7691 TSA All Stars
PNW Lake Oswego Event	Lake Oswego, Oregon	March 28 – 30	4488 Shockwave, 4043 NerdHerd, 4110 DEEP SPACE 9'ers
Silicon Valley Regional	San Jose, California	March 28 – 31	254 The Cheesy Poofs, 5499 The Bay Orangutans, 641 The Missfits
PCH Forsyth Event	Alpharetta, Georgia	March 29 – 31	1746 OTTO, 6829 Ignite Robotics, 2415 WiredCats
NE Central Mass Event	Shrewsbury, Massachusetts	March 29 – 31	78 AIR STRIKE, 125 NUTRONs, 6328 Mechanical Advantage
FNC UNC Pembroke Event	Pembroke, North Carolina	March 29 – 31	4534 Wired Wizards, 7890 SeQuEnCe, 3661 RoboWolves
NE UNH Event	Durham, New Hampshire	March 29 – 31	2370 IBOTS, 1922 Oz-Ram, 6691 Torque
FMA Montgomery Event	Skillman, New Jersey	March 29 – 31	747 Flight Crew, 225 TechFire, 4653 Ironmen Robotics
FMA Bensalem Event	Bensalem, Pennsylvania	March 29 – 31	2590 Nemesis, 1807 Redbird Robotics, 7599 Blue Pride
CHS Blacksburg VA Event	Blacksburg, Virginia	March 29 – 31	346 RoboHawks, 619 Cavalier Robotics, 3274 Rocktown Robotics
FIT Dallas Event	Dallas, Texas	March 29 – 31	148 Robowranglers, 6672 Fusion Corps, 3282 Dallas Robo Tigers
PNW Auburn Event	Auburn, Washington	March 29 – 31	2046 Bear Metal, 2990 Hotwire, 4579 RoboEagles

=== Week 6 ===
Event	Location	Date	Champions
Israel District Championship	Tel Aviv-Yafo, Israel	April 2 – 4	4338 Falcons, 3075 Ha-Dream Team, 5990 TRIGON
Seven Rivers Regional	La Crosse, Wisconsin	April 3 – 6	2826 Wave Robotics, 111 WildStang, 4296 Trident Robotics
Canadian Rockies	Calgary, Alberta	April 3 – 6	359 Hawaiian Kids, 2122 Team Tators, 6841 Cerberus 2.0
Arizona West	Phoenix, Arizona	April 3 – 6	6479 AZTECH Robotics, 498 The Cobra Commanders, 6833 Phoenix Robotics
Festival de Robotique à Québec City	Quebec City, Québec, Canada	April 3 – 6	3996 RIKITIK, 3386 Tornades, 2095 Direct Current
Peachtree District Championship	Emerson, Georgia	April 3 – 6	4910 East Cobb Robotics, 2974 Walton Robotics, 2415 WiredCats
Pacific Northwest District Championship	Tacoma, Washington	April 3 – 6	2046 Bear Metal, 2910 Jack in the Bot, 2907 Lion Robotics
Mid-Atlantic District Championship	Bethlehem, Pennsylvania	April 3 – 6	225 TechFire, 747 Flight Crew, 5401 Fightin' Robotic Owls
Aerospace Valley Regional	Lancaster, California	April 3 – 6	1678 Citrus Circuits, 3476 Code Orange, 2637 Phantom Catz
Texas District Championship	Austin, Texas	April 3 – 6	148 Robowranglers, 3310 Black Hawk Robotics, 3035 Droid Rage
NE Pine Tree Event	Lewiston, Maine	April 4 – 6	5687 The Outliers, 133 B.E.R.T., 4055 NRG
FIM Forest Hills Event	Grand Rapids, Michigan	April 4 – 6	910 The Foley Freeze, 2337 EngiNERDs, 7809 Valhalla Nation
FIM Lansing Event	Mason, Michigan	April 4 – 6	3707 TechnoDogs, 4776 S.C.O.T.S. Bots, 6085 Green Devil Bots
FIM Livonia Event	Livonia, Michigan	April 4 – 6	2832 The Livonia Warriors, 5907 CC Shambots, 1076 Pi Hi Samurai
FIM Lake Superior State University Event	Sault Ste. Marie, Michigan	April 4 – 6	6569 Gladiators, 4391 BraveBots, 7244 Huskies Robotics
FIM Traverse City Event	Traverse City, Michigan	April 4 – 6	1684 The Chimeras, 3688 Norsemen, 7855 Chronic Robophobia
New York City Regional	New York City, New York	April 4 – 7	1796 RoboTigers, 694 StuyPulse, 2265 Fe Maidens
Central Missouri Regional	Sedalia, Missouri	April 4 – 7	1987 Broncobots, 1939 THE KUHNIGITS, 1094 Channel Cats
NE Hartford Event	Hartford, Connecticut	April 5 – 7	230 Gaelhawks, 195 CyberKnights, 7869 The Fun Gang
North Carolina District Championship	Lillington, North Carolina	April 5 – 7	5190 Falcon Fury, 1533 Triple Strange, 4290 Bots on Wheels
ONT McMaster University Event	Hamilton, Ontario, Canada	April 5 – 7	2056 OP Robotics, 1241 THEORY6, 6070 Gryphon Machine
ONT Western University, Western Engineering Event	London, Ontario, Canada	April 5 – 7	4525 Renaissance Robotics, 4814 WE MARS Incubator, 7722 Resurrection MechaPhoenix

=== Week 7 ===
Event	Location	Date	Champions
Chesapeake District Championship	Fairfax, Virginia	April 10 – 13	619 Cavalier Robotics, 401 Copperhead Robotics, 4541 CAVineers
Michigan State Championship	University Center, Michigan	April 10 – 13	4362 CSPA Gems, 3604 Goon Squad, 862 Lightning Robotics
Ontario Provincial Championship	Mississauga, Ontario	April 10 – 13	1114 Simbotics, 1241 THEORY6, 771 SWAT
New England District Championship	Worcester, Massachusetts	April 10 – 13	125 NUTRONs, 2168 Aluminum Falcons, 558 Elm City Robo Squad
Indiana District Championship	Kokomo, Indiana	April 11 – 13	868 TechHOUNDS, 234 Cyber Blue, 1024 Kil-A-Bytes

=== FIRST Championship ===
Event	Location	Date
FIRST Championship (Houston)	Houston, Texas	April 17–20
FIRST Championship (Detroit)	Detroit, Michigan	April 24–27

== Results ==
The following tables show the winners of the subdivisions and finals at each FIRST Championship event.

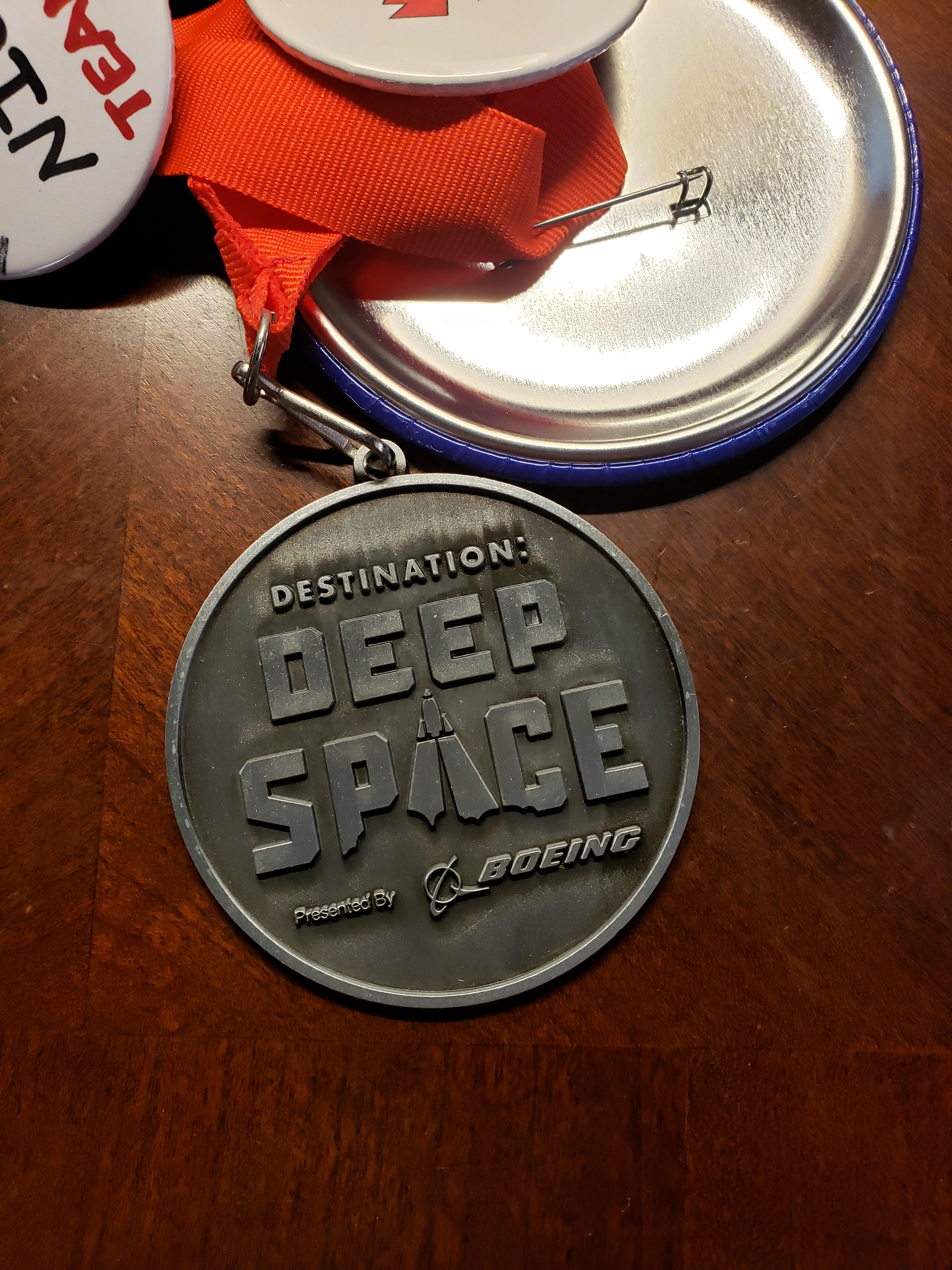
Medal awarded to the finalist alliance in Hudson Valley, New York.

=== Houston ===
==== Subdivision Winners ====
Division	Captain	1st Pick	2nd Pick	3rd Pick
Carver	1678	7179	3132	1939
Galileo	971	179	3646	498
Hopper	2122	2046	6485	4192
Newton	973	1323	5026	4201
Roebling	148	3847	6829	2907
Turing	254	3310	6986	948

==== Einstein ====
===== Round Robin =====
Pos	Division	Pld	W	L	Pts	Qualification
1	Turing (Q)	5	5	0	2	Advance to Einstein Finals
2	Newton (Q)	5	4	1	1.6	Advance to Einstein Finals
3	Carver	5	2	3	0.8	
4	Galileo	5	2	3	0.8	
5	Hopper	5	1	4	0.4	
6	Roebling	5	1	4	0.4	

(Q) Qualified for the phase indicated

===== Finals =====
Division	Alliance	1	2	3	Wins
Turing	254-3310-6986-948	117	98	103	1
Newton	973-1323-5026-4201	106	119	114	2

=== Detroit ===
==== Subdivision Winners ====
Division	Captain	1st Pick	2nd Pick	3rd Pick
Archimedes	5406	930	1310	4004
Tesla	346	548	5401	2534
Carson	5050	111	4607	2052
Darwin	3707	217	4481	1218
Curie	195	3538	1073	230
Daly	4003	133	862	2614

==== Einstein ====
===== Round Robin =====
Pos	Division	Pld	W	D	L	Pts	Qualification
1	Archimedes (Q)	5	4	1	0	1.8	Advance to Einstein Finals
2	Darwin (Q)	5	3	1	1	1.4	Advance to Einstein Finals
3	Curie	5	3	0	2	1.2	
4	Tesla	5	2	2	1	1.2	
5	Carson	5	1	0	4	0.4	
6	Daly	5	0	0	5	0	

(Q) Qualified for the phase indicated

===== Finals =====
Division	Alliance	1	2	3	Wins
Archimedes	5406-930-1310-4004	107	78	90	1
Darwin	3707-217-4481-1218	101	96	91	2
