= James A. McLane =

American educator

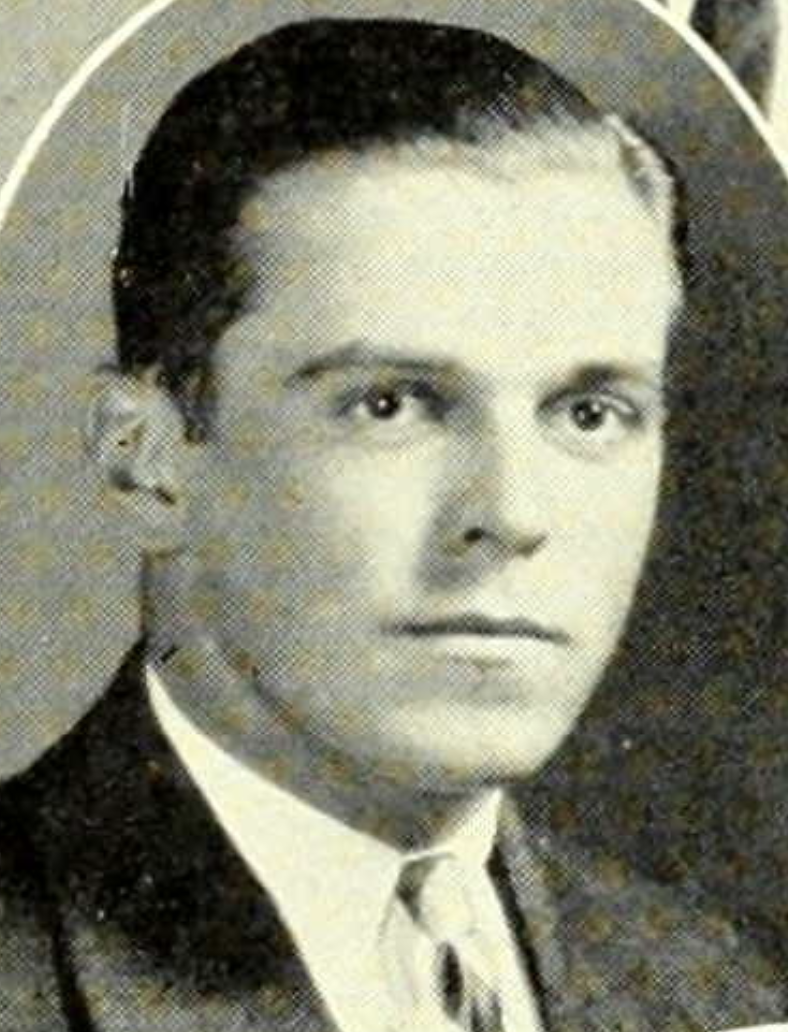
- Born: June 11, 1906; Watertown, New York, U.S.
- Died: May 21, 1970 (aged 63); North Hornell, New York, U.S.
- Employer: Alfred University
- Known for: Alfred University athletic director for 36 years

James Adelbert McLane (June 11, 1906 – May 21, 1970) was an American coach, instructor, head of the physical education department, and athletic director for Alfred University in Alfred, New York. He was a guiding figure in the development of overall intercollegiate athletics at Alfred University and served as their athletic director from August 1934 until July 1970. The James A. McLane Physical Education Center at Alfred University was named for him.

== Early life and education ==
James McLane was born in Watertown, New York. He grew up there and in Dexter, New York, and graduated from Dexter High School. His parents were Adelbert C. McLane and Eva M. McLane (née Baker). McLane attended Springfield College in Springfield, Massachusetts, where he participated in junior varsity football, varsity football, junior varsity basketball, and varsity track. He was a member of the student senate in his junior and senior years, serving as president in his senior year. McLane graduated from Springfield College in 1928 with a Bachelor of Physical Education. Upon graduation, McLane served as director of a boys and girls summer camp in Foxboro, Massachusetts before beginning his career at Alfred University. He later earned a Master of Arts degree from Columbia University.

== Career ==
McLane began his career at Alfred University in 1928 as assistant athletic director and as freshman coach in football, basketball, and track.

On January 26, 1931 McLane was appointed to the Track and Field and Cross Country Committee of the Niagara Association of the American Athletic Union. The goal of the committee was to encourage more competition among females in track and field events. McLane was officially appointed as the university's athletic director in August 1934. In May 1940 McLane was named as the dedicatee for the 1940 Kanakadea, Alfred University's annual yearbook.

In May 1941 McLane temporarily suspended the freshman ineligibility rule for football players after five of its seven backfield players were drafted into the Army under the Selected Service Act. McLane made the ruling when it became clear that the alternative was discontinuing the football program because of a lack of eligible players. In October 1941, he added a new press box and broadcasting booth to Merrill Field.

Beginning in January 1942 McLane expanded and supervised Alfred University's physical education requirements in order to prepare students for military and home-defense services. In addition to serving as the school's athletic director, McLane now served as chairman of the school's Defense Committee. The expanded physical education program required three hours of training a week for juniors and seniors who already completed their curriculum's physical education requirements, and one additional hour a week for freshman and sophomores already enrolled in required physical education classes. McLane also encouraged students to complement the expanded program with additional sports activities.

In August 1942 McLane announced the suspension of the intercollegiate football program for the duration of the war and the cancellation of the 1942 season. The reasons provided included difficulty finding a successor for Coach Alexander Yunevich who had joined the Navy, and reduced enrollment. McLane promoted an intramural football program to maintain interest. The football program did not resume until the Fall of 1946 when Coach Yunevich, who completed his naval service had returned as head coach.

McLane began serving as a trustee on the Alfred town board in 1949. His contributions included planning a recreation program for teenagers in 1950 and working to include a $500 recreation appropriation in the 1950-51 town budget to support the program.

On July 11, 1962, McLane retired as the Alfred University head track and field coach after serving for 34 years. He continued his tenure as athletic director. Dr. Leland Miles, the president of Alfred University, announced on October 11, 1969 the decision to name the new physical education complex the James A. McLane Physical Education Center. Ground was broken for the center on the same day. McLane had been a patient in a hospital since August and was unable to attend the ceremony. His wife Elva broke ground. On February 12, 1970 it was announced that Paul Powers would become director of athletics on July 1, replacing McLane who had been director since 1933. McLane was on indefinite sick leave at the time of the announcement. McLane was awarded the James Lynah Memorial Award by the Eastern College Athletic Conference on February 24, 1970. Alex Yunevich accepted the award on behalf of McLane who was ill. McLane was among the six charter members named to Alfred University's sports hall of fame in July 1973.

== Personal life and death ==
James McLane married Elva Starr in August 1931. Elva was a math instructor at Alfred University. They had two children. McLane died on May 21, 1970 after a long illness. The dedication ceremony for the James A. McLane Physical Education Center was held on September 9, 1971. Television sports commentator and former Dallas Cowboys quarterback Don Meredith was a speaker at the dedication.
