= Sandra Murchison =

Sandra Murchison is a collegiate art professor, and a multimedia artist working predominantly in printmaking and encaustic paintings. Originally from New Jersey, Murchison received her BFA from Alfred University and her MFA from Louisiana State University. Currently, Murchison is the director of the School of Art and Design at Eastern Michigan University, and before that, worked as Professor of Art at Millsaps College where she taught book arts, printmaking, painting and drawing. Murchison is represented by Guy Lyman Fine Arts Gallery in New Orleans. Murchison serves as the Vice President of Internal Affairs to SGC International, a non-profit organization that supports print artists.

== Recognitions and exhibitions ==
Murchison has receiving numerous awards including the 2014 HEADWAE Faculty Award for Millsaps College, 2013 Millsaps College Distinguished Professor Award, 2011 Mississippi Humanities Council Humanities Teacher Award for Millsaps College and 2011 Richard A. Smith Award for Excellence in Scholarship or Creative Work at Millsaps College. In 2015, she was nominated for a Joan Mitchell Foundation Grant for Painters and Sculptors. Murchison's work has been shown in over 60 national and international juried exhibitions, and her work is featured in Contemporary American Printmakers. She has had solo exhibitions at the following institutions: University of the Arts and Mansfield University, both in Pennsylvania, the Greater Jackson Arts Council, Loyola University New Orleans, Rockhurst University in Kansas City, Missouri, and Delta State University, Millsaps College, and the Cottonlandia Museum, all in Mississippi.
