= Sally M. Hage =

American psychology professor

Sally M. Hage is an American professor of psychology at The Chicago School who is known for her work on preventing and coping with trauma, mindfulness, and multicultural training. She is the founding editor-in-chief of the Journal of Prevention and Health Promotion. She is the author of two books, including Best Practices in Prevention (Sage Publications) and An Ounce of Prevention: Evidence-Based Prevention for Counseling and Psychology (Cambridge University Press).

== Education and career ==
Hage received her B.A. from the University of St. Thomas (Minnesota) in 1985 and her M.Div. in 1988 from the University of Notre Dame. She earned her Ph.D. at the University of Minnesota in 1998. As of 2014 she is a professor of psychology at Springfield College.

In 2020 Hage was the founding editor-in-chief of the Journal of Prevention and Health Promotion.

== Selected publications ==
- Hage, Sally M.; Hopson, Amy; Siegel, Matthew; Payton, Gregory; DeFanti, Elizabeth (2006). "Multicultural Training in Spirituality: An Interdisciplinary Review". Counseling and Values. 50 (3): 217–234. doi:10.1002/j.2161-007X.2006.tb00058.x.
- Hage, Sally M. (2006). "A closer look at the role of spirituality in psychology training programs". Professional Psychology: Research and Practice. 37 (3): 303–310. doi:10.1037/0735-7028.37.3.303. ISSN 1939-1323.
- Constantine, Madonna G.; Hage, Sally M.; Kindaichi, Mai M.; Bryant, Rhonda M. (2007). "Social Justice and Multicultural Issues: Implications for the Practice and Training of Counselors and Counseling Psychologists". Journal of Counseling & Development. 85 (1): 24–29. doi:10.1002/j.1556-6678.2007.tb00440.x. ISSN 0748-9633.
- Hage, Sally M.; Kenny, Maureen E. (January 2009). "Promoting a Social Justice Approach to Prevention: Future Directions for Training, Practice, and Research". The Journal of Primary Prevention. 30 (1): 75–87. doi:10.1007/s10935-008-0165-5. ISSN 0278-095X. PMID 19096936. S2CID 37529301.
- Hage, Sally M.; Loughran, Mary Jo; Renninger, Salina M.; Cyranowski, Jill M. (July 2020). "PsyD Programs in Counseling Psychology: Current Status and Future Directions". The Counseling Psychologist. 48 (5): 716–737. doi:10.1177/0011000020916787. ISSN 0011-0000. S2CID 219738403.

== Honors and awards ==
In 2007 Hage was one of the winners of The Counseling Psychologist Outstanding Contribution Award from the American Psychological Association. She was elected a fellow of the American Psychological Association in 2014. She received the APA Society of Counseling Psychology Prevention Section Lifetime Achievement Award.
