= Rebuilt (FIRST) =

2026 FIRST Robotics Competition game

- Year: 2026

Season Information
- Number of teams: 3,791
- Number of regionals: 56
- Number of district events: 144
- Championship location: Houston; George R. Brown Convention Center

FIRST Championship Awards
- Champions: 1323 – "MadTown Robotics" 4065 – "Nerds of Prey" 4414 – "HighTide" 1538 – "The Holy Cows"

Rebuilt, stylized as REBUILT and officially known as Rebuilt presented by Haas for sponsorship reasons, is the FIRST Robotics Competition game for the 2026 season. The game is themed around re-imagining the past as part of the FIRST-wide FIRST Age season, which focuses on archaeology. Kickoff took place on January 10, 2026, and was broadcast on YouTube, including at local kickoff events featuring multiple teams.

Game play centers on robots shooting high-density foam balls (called Fuel) into a central goal on their side of the field. At the end of the match, robots may move to a ladder-shaped structure called the Tower and climb up to three rungs to earn additional points.

== Field and Scoring ==
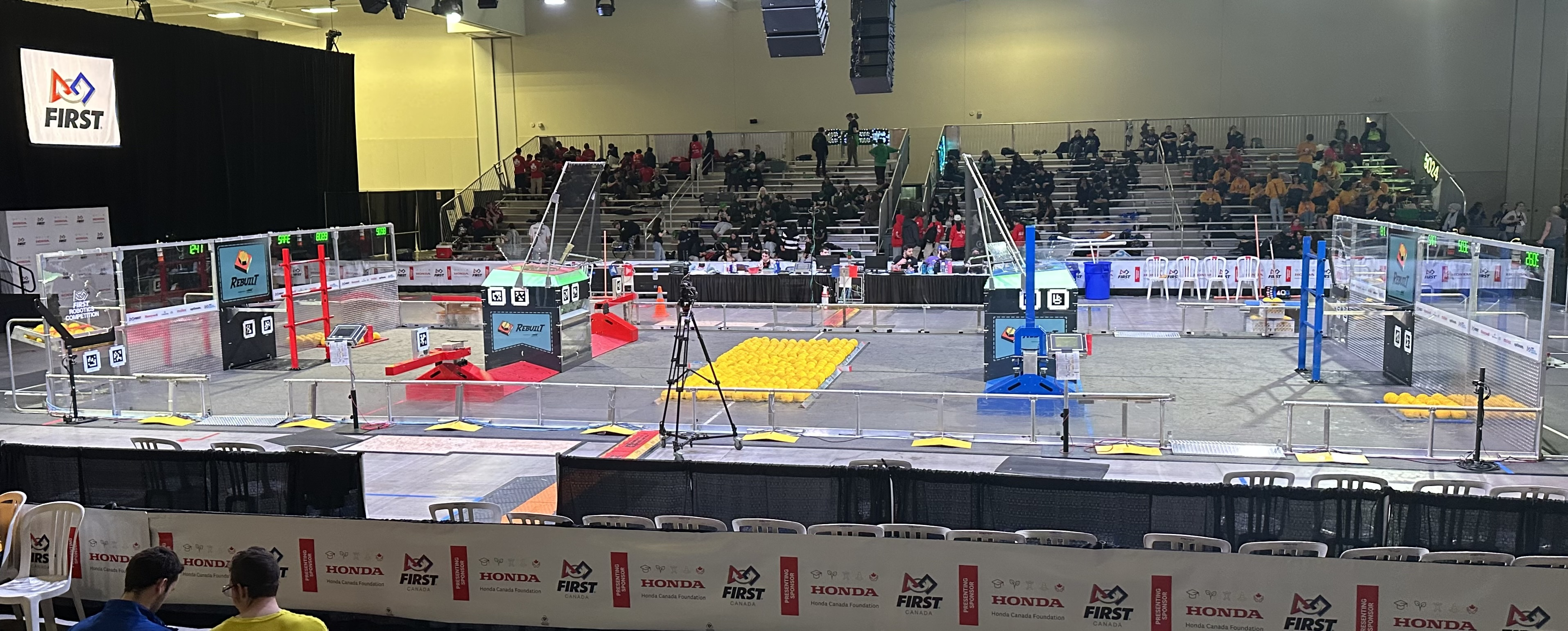
Playing field set up at the Niagara Falls Convention Centre, Niagara Falls, Ontario.

Rebuilt is played on a 27 feet (8.2 m) by 54 feet (16 m) field covered in grey carpet. The field is surrounded by low polycarbonate walls on the long sides and taller alliance station walls on the short sides. The field is split into three zones: one Neutral Zone in the center between the Trenches, and one Alliance Zone on either side, between the Trench and Alliance Wall and containing the Robot Starting Line.

The field is divided in half by the Center Line: each half includes an alliance's Hub, Tower, Outpost, Depot, Bumps, and Trenches. The Outpost includes each alliance's Corral and Chute. Alliances work to shoot Fuel into their Hub, located at the center of their side of the field. Points can only be gained when the Hub is activated, which alternates throughout the match.

=== Game Piece ===
The only game piece in Rebuilt is Fuel: 504 high-density yellow foam balls, each 5.91 inches (15.0 cm) in diameter and weighing about 0.5 pounds (0.23 kg). They are made and sold exclusively by manufacturer AndyMark. Before a match, the balls are placed around the field, mostly in the Neutral Zone. Robots may be preloaded with up to eight.

== FIRST Championship ==
The FIRST Championship was held at the George R. Brown Convention Center (GRB) in Houston, Texas, from April 29 to May 2, 2026. It was announced in January that FIRST will hold the Championship event at the GRB through 2034.

At the championship event, teams are randomly divided into 8 divisions of 75 teams, each named after a STEM pioneer. The winners of each division moved on to compete in the Einstein tournament:

=== Division winners ===
| Division | Captain | 1st Pick | 2nd Pick | 3rd Pick |
|---|---|---|---|---|
| Archimedes | 5940 (BREAD) from Redwood City, California, USA | 9470 (Ctrl-Alt-Defeat) from Fremont, California, USA | 3006 (Red Rock Robotics) from Salt Lake City, Utah, USA | 7407 (Wired Boars) from Wallingford, Connecticut, USA |
| Curie | 6800 (Valor) from Austin, Texas, USA | 254 (The Cheesy Poofs) from San Jose, California, USA | 8613 (Barker Greybacks) from Sydney, Australia, Australia | 1714 (MORE Robotics) from Milwaukee, Wisconsin, USA |
| Daly | 4414 (HighTide) from Ventura, California, USA | 1323 (MadTown Robotics) from Madera, California, USA | 4065 (Nerds of Prey) from Minneola, Florida, USA | 1538 (The Holy Cows) from San Diego, California, USA |
| Galileo | 7769 (The CREW) from Royal Oak, Michigan, USA | 1690 (Orbit) from Binyamina, HaZafon, Israel | 5181 (Explorer Robotics) from Wyndmoor, Pennsylvania, USA | 8229 (Balikbayan Bots) from Las Vegas, Nevada, USA |
| Hopper | 2056 (OP Robotics) from Stoney Creek, Ontario, Canada | 6329 (The Bucks' Wrath) from Bucksport, Maine, USA | 3506 (YETI Robotics) from Charlotte, North Carolina, USA | 4613 (Barker Redbacks) from Sydney, New South Wales, Australia |
| Johnson | 6324 (The Blue Devils) from Salem, New Hampshire, USA | 4946 (The Alpha Dogs) from Bolton, Ontario, Canada | 2337 (EngiNERDs) from Grand Blanc, Michigan, USA | 2877 (LigerBots) from Newtonville, Massachusetts, USA |
| Milstein | 1678 (Citrus Circuits) Davis, California, USA | 2481 (Roboteers) from Tremont, Illinois, USA | 4915 (Spartronics) from Bainbridge Island, Washington, USA | 4905 (Andromeda One) from Ayer, Massachusetts, USA |
| Newton | 2910 (Jack in the Bot) from Mill Creek, Washington, USA | 2046 (Bear Metal) from Maple Valley, Washington, USA | 868 (TechHOUNDS) from Carmel, Indiana, USA | 4206 (Robo Vikes) from Fort Worth, Texas, USA |

=== Einstein tournament bracket ===
The Championship playoff tournament follows a double elimination bracket format. All matchups are best-of-one with the exception of the finals, which is a best-of-three series.

Upper round 1 | Upper round 2 | Upper final | Einstein finals
Archimedes | 443
Newton | 665
Newton | 707
Galileo | 470
Galileo | 618
Hopper | 468
Newton | 565
Daly | 692
Curie | 717
Milstein | 632
Curie | 627
Daly | 713
Daly | 842
Johnson | 484 | Daly | 2 wins
Newton | 1 win
Lower round 1 | Lower round 2 | Lower round 3 | Lower final
Curie | 769
Archimedes | 703 | Archimedes | 638 | Newton | 616
Hopper | 599 | Curie | 699 | Galileo | 605
Galileo | 720
Galileo | 831
Milstein | 688 | Johnson | 513
Johnson | 691

=== Einstein finals ===
| Division | Final 1 | Final 2 | Tiebreaker | Wins |
|---|---|---|---|---|
| Daly | 456 | 711 | 712 | 2 |
| Newton | 518 | 561 | 406 | 1 |
