= Hongwei Li =

Chinese sculptor

- Education: Central Academy of Fine Arts
- Alma mater: Alfred University
- Known for: Sculptor
- Awards: Taylor Prize

Hongwei Li is a Chinese sculptor. He currently works and lives in Beijing and New York.

== Biography ==
In 2005 he received a bachelor's degree in sculpture from the Central Academy of Fine Arts in Beijing. In 2007 he completed his master's degree from the School of Art and Design within the New York State College of Ceramics at Alfred University (Alfred, New York) and then served as a faculty member there.

Since 2009 he has been a visiting scholar of Alfred University.

== Career ==
In 2013, he was awarded the Taylor Prize by the 2013 France International Salon.

Hongwei's works are in the permanent collections of the Art Institute of Chicago and the San Angelo Museum of Fine Arts in Texas.
