= Rob Forbes =

American designer and entrepreneur

Rob Forbes is an American designer and entrepreneur. He is the founder of the furniture company Design Within Reach, and of the bicycle retailer Public Bikes (stylized "PUBLIC").

== Early life and education ==
Forbes grew up in Pasadena and Laguna Beach, California. He studied aesthetics at UC Santa Cruz and received a Masters of Fine Arts in ceramics from New York State College of Ceramics at Alfred University.

== Career ==
Forbes received a National Endowment for the Arts grant, and spent his early career as a potter and exhibiting artist; he also taught at Philadelphia College of Art. After earning his MBA at Stanford University, Forbes worked as a marketer at Williams Sonoma, Smith & Hawken, and the Nature Company.

=== Design Within Reach ===
In 1999 Forbes founded the company Design Within Reach, which marketed European modern furnishings to American buyers. Products were shipped directly to the buyer through catalogue and online ordering. After rapid initial growth, Design Within Reach became a public company in 2004. Shortly thereafter Forbes left the company; by 2009 it was in financial difficulty, delisted from the stock exchange and was sold to hedge fund Glenhill Capital Management.

=== Public Bikes ===
In 2010 Forbes founded Public Bikes, an online bike retailer. The company designs and sells European-style bicycles aimed at urban cyclists.

== Other art and design work ==
Forbes opened an art studio in San Francisco. In 2011, he curated an exhibit of pottery and ceramics at Frank Lloyd Gallery in Santa Monica.

Forbes writes and lectures on visual thinking and modern design. He presented a TED Talk, "Ways of Seeing" in 2006, and has also spoken at AGFA SF. Forbes has written a book called See For Yourself, released in May 2015. He created and contributes to DWR Design Notes, a monthly newsletter on modernism and design.

== Publications ==
- See For Yourself by Rob Forbes. ISBN 978-1-4521-1714-0
- Design Research: The Store That Brought Modern Living to American Homes, 2010 by Jane Thompson and Alexandra Lange, foreword by Rob Forbes. ISBN 0-8118-6818-4
- How to See, 2nd edition by George Nelson, foreword by Rob Forbes. ISBN 0974491802
- Bent Ply by Dung Ngo, Eric Pfeiffer, a book about the story of plywood in Modernist furniture design, foreword by Rob Forbes. ISBN 1568984057
- Heath Ceramics, a book about the history of the ceramics company by Amos Klausner, contributor Rob Forbes. ISBN 0811855600
