= Three-dimensional art =

Three-dimensional (3D) art may refer to:

- digital art created using 3D computer graphics
- any form of visual art resulting in a three-dimensional physical object, such as sculpture, architecture, installation art and many decorative art forms
- two-dimensional art that creates the appearance of being in 3D, such as through stereoscopy, anamorphosis, or photorealism

== See also ==
- 3D (disambiguation)
