= Daniel Rhodes =

American sculptor and artist

- Born: May 8, 1911; Fort Dodge, Iowa, US
- Died: July 23, 1989 (aged 78); Reno, Nevada, US
- Other name: Dan Rhodes
- Education: Art Students League of New York, University of Chicago, Art Institute of Chicago, Colorado Springs Fine Arts Center, Alfred University
- Spouse(s): Lillyan Rhodes, Mary Beth Coulter
- Children: 2, including Aaron Rhodes

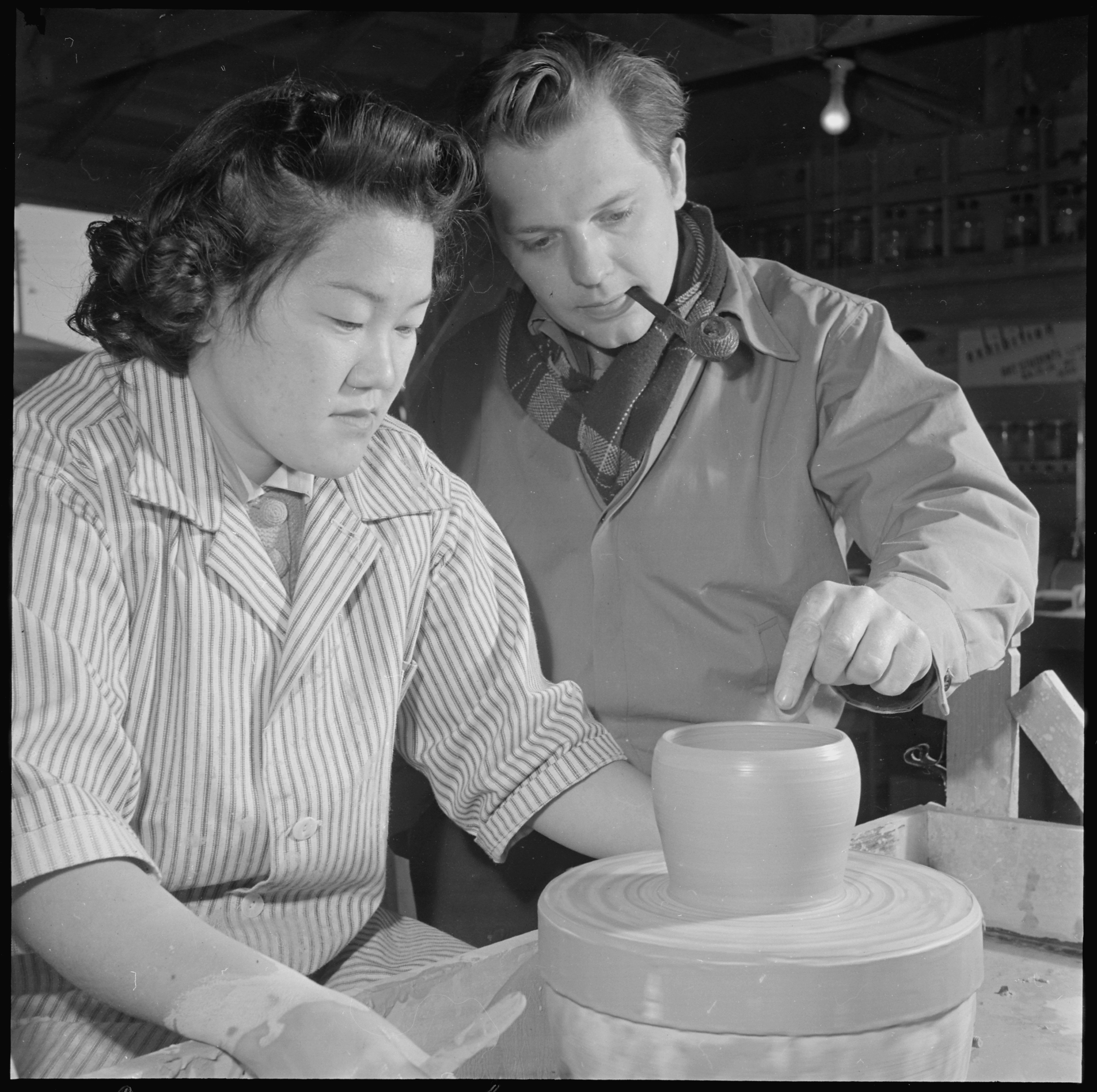
Daniel Rhodes (right) assists a ceramics student at Heart Mountain Relocation Center in Wyoming (January 1943)

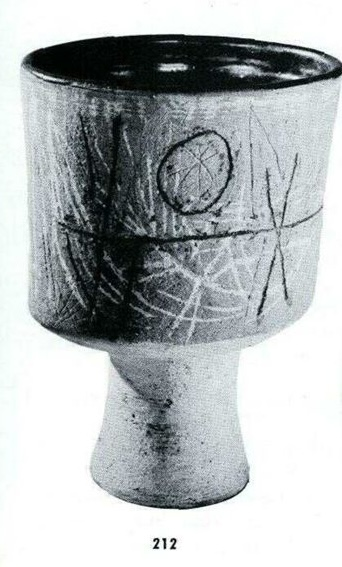
Daniel Rhodes, "Bowl", stoneware, from Craftsmanship in a Changing World (1956)

Daniel Rhodes (May 8, 1911 – July 23, 1989) was an American artist, known as a ceramic artist, muralist, sculptor, author and educator. During his 25 years (1947–1973) on the faculty at the New York State College of Ceramics at Alfred University, in Alfred, New York (a division of the State University of New York), he built an international reputation as a potter, sculptor and authority on studio pottery.

== Early life and education ==
Rhodes was born on May 8, 1911, and raised in Fort Dodge, Iowa, the son of Daniel J. and Margaret Agnes (née Brennan) Rhodes. He began his art career by enrolling in summer courses at the Art Institute of Chicago. He attended the University of Chicago for four years (1929–1933), earning a Bachelor of Arts degree with a major in Art History. He worked with Iowa painter Grant Wood for two summers (1932 and 1933) at the Stone City Art Colony, and then also studied at the Art Students League of New York (1933–34), where his teacher was Regionalist painter John Steuart Curry.

From 1935 to 1938, Rhodes lived in Fort Dodge, where he worked as a painter and muralist, participated in the Fort Dodge Art Guild, and lectured at the Blanden Art Gallery (now the Blanden Memorial Art Museum). While living in Iowa, he participated actively in the state's art circles, and frequently exhibited at the Iowa State Fair, where he won an unprecedented three consecutive annual sweepstakes awards for oil painting from 1938 to 1940, outdistancing a record held by Grant Wood.

After additional study in 1940 at the Colorado Springs Fine Arts Center (where he began to work with clay), Rhodes entered the graduate program at New York State College of Ceramics at Alfred University, where, in 1942, he became the first person to graduate from that school's Master of Fine Arts program. After completing his MFA degree at Alfred University, the Rhodes remained in that area, where he worked as a designer for Glidden Pottery.

In 1939-40, Rhodes taught at the Art Students’ Workshop in Des Moines, Iowa and was also a guest lecturer at the Ottumwa Art Center and Iowa State University.

In 1940, he married the former Lillyan Estelle Jacobs of Des Moines, a potter, sculptor and figurative painter whom he had met at Stone City. They raised two children, a daughter and a son. Lillyan Rhodes died in 1986.

== Murals ==
Rhodes received several mural commissions from the Section of Painting and Sculpture. The first, titled Storm Lake (1937), was created for the post office at Storm Lake, Iowa. Later, when a new post office was built, the mural was relocated to the public library.

In the same year, Rhodes and another Iowa painter named Howard C. Johnson were commissioned to create a large mural (110 feet wide by 10 feet (3.0 m) high), planned for installation in the Agricultural Building at the Iowa State Fairgrounds in Des Moines. Titled Where tillage begins, other arts follow, the project was a commemoration of Iowa agriculture: planting, harvesting, production, and the meat packing industry. Unfortunately, it soon became the subject of a public derision. Opinionated passersby complained about factual inaccuracies in the mural, claimed that the figures of Iowans were too solemn, and objected to what they considered to be a style that was “too modern.” In 1946, Iowa State Fair Board Secretary Lloyd Cunningham ordered that the mural be taken down and that the dismantled pieces be used as scrap lumber. Apparently, all that now survives of the mural are a few photographs.

Another mural is titled Communication by Mail (1939) and is located at Marion, Iowa. Rhodes painted this mural in the time-honored technique of fresco-secco, directly onto the Post Office's lobby wall. It features the role of the railroad in transporting mail. The Post Office was decommissioned and sold to the city of Marion in 1968. The city used the building as the City Hall until 2005. The building sat empty for a year before being bought by a bank. In June 2008, Anton Rajer a professional fine art conservator from Green Bay, WI will begin work to move the mural to the Marion Heritage Center. The mural is estimated to weigh approximately 2,000–3,000 pounds, and will be removed from the building in one piece by a team of contractors.

Rhodes created a mural, Airmail (1941), for the U.S. Post Office in Piggott, Arkansas. On April 10, 2019, in Piggott, the US Postal Service released a series of postage stamps featuring post office murals, including "Airmail." The Postal Service planned to produce 30 million of the stamps.

His success in completing these projects led to Rhodes being commissioned for New Deal art projects in other states, including post office murals at Clayton, Missouri (now at the Federal Building in Des Moines), and Glen Ellyn, Illinois; and a cafeteria mural in the main U.S. Navy building in Washington, D.C.

== Later life and career ==
In 1943, they moved to California, where he worked in San Jose as a researcher in high heat ceramics for the Henry J. Kaiser Corporation. Three years later, they moved to Menlo Park, California, where in 1947 they built a full-scale ceramic studio, and created thrown and cast ware for Gump's, the San Francisco department store. During the same period, Rhodes was briefly on the faculties at Stanford University (1946) and the San Francisco Art Institute (1946–47). In 1947, they returned to New York State, where Rhodes joined the art department faculty of his alma mater, the New York State College of Ceramics at Alfred University, where he taught from 1947 to 1973.

While at Alfred University, Rhodes also taught summer sessions in ceramics at the University of Southern California, Los Angeles (1952–53); Black Mountain College, Asheville, North Carolina; and the Haystack Mountain School of Crafts, Deer Isle, Maine (1961). Rhodes later taught at the University of California, Santa Cruz (1977–1980).

Rhodes was the recipient of a Fulbright Fellowship and lived in Japan from 1962 to 1963. The National Council on Education for the Ceramic Arts (NCECA) awarded him a medal of citation for his contributions to teaching in 1973. His accomplishments were recognized by major retrospectives at the Blanden Memorial Art Museum, Fort Dodge, Iowa (1973), and at Iowa State University, Ames (1986).

In the last phase of his life, Rhodes married his second wife, Mary Beth Coulter.

== Death and legacy ==
At the start of a two-month tour of college campuses, he was conducting a workshop at Sierra Nevada College when he was stricken by a heart attack and died in Reno, Nevada, in July 1989, aged 78.

Rhodes' work is in many permanent museum collections including the Smithsonian American Art Museum, Oakland Museum of California, the Victoria and Albert Museum, Everson Museum of Art, Fine Arts Museums of San Francisco, Detroit Institute of Arts, National Museum of Modern Art, Kyoto, Museum of Contemporary Crafts, Des Moines Art Center, among others.

In 2020, artist Kari Marboe created a tribute work and exhibition for Rhodes at Mills College titled, Kari Marboe: Duplicating Daniel.

== Writings ==
As an authority on ceramics techniques, Rhodes is well known as an author among studio potters and ceramic sculptors.

- Clay and Glazes for the Potter. Philadelphia: Chilton Book Company (1957).
- Stoneware and Porcelain: The Art of High-Fired Pottery. Philadelphia: Chilton Book Company (1959).
- Kilns: Design, Construction and Operation. Philadelphia: Chilton Book Company (1968).
- Tamba Pottery: The Timeless Art of a Japanese Village. Tokyo: Kodansha International (1970).
- Pottery Form. Radnor, Pennsylvania: Chilton Book Company (1976).
- With Miska Petersham. Understanding the Small-Scale Clay Products Enterprise. Arlington, Virginia: Volunteers in Technical Assistance (1984).
