= List of Chicago State University people =

The list of Chicago State University people includes notable alumni, non-graduates, faculty and staff, chief executives, and affiliates of the Chicago State University.

== Academia ==
- James A. Banks, founding director, Center for Multicultural Education, University of Washington; received bachelor's degree in social science and education from CSU in 1963
- Jack Dongarra, distinguished professor of computer science at the University of Tennessee; earned Bachelor of Science in mathematics at CSU
- Frances Ekstam, professor and founder of the physical therapy program at Indiana University School of Medicine
- LaTanya McDade, first African American and first woman to serve in the role of Superintendent of Prince William County Public Schools in Virginia; earned Bachelor of Arts in Education in 1998
- Cynthia Nance, Nathan G. Gordon Professor of Law at the University of Arkansas School of Law; graduated magna cum laude from CSU
- Martin Ridge, historian and director of research at the Huntington Library; earned bachelor of education at CSU in 1943
- Margaret Taylor-Burroughs, co-founder of the DuSable Museum of African American History

== Activism ==
- Margaret A. Haley, teacher, unionist, and land value tax activist; took classes for several years at CSU when it was Cook County Normal University
- Rhoda Hatch, teacher, anti-war activist and one of the first one hundred people in Chicago to die from COVID-19
- Mamie Till, activist, educator, and mother of Emmett Till; graduated from CSU
- Jacqueline B. Vaughn, first female president of the Chicago Teachers Union

== Athletics ==
- Deji Akindele, professional basketball player for Yalova Group BelediyeSpor of the Turkish Basketball First League
- Darron Brittman, former basketball player; first officially recognized NCAA Division I season steals leader in 1985–86
- Josephine D'Angelo, left fielder who played 1943–1944 in the All-American Girls Professional Baseball League; later earned her master's degree from CSU
- James "Chico" Hernandez, FIAS World Cup Vice-Champion in Sombo Wrestling; graduated from CSU
- David Holston, basketball player for JDA Dijon Basket of France's LNB Pro A; played for the Chicago State Cougars men's basketball team
- Bob Janecyk, goaltender for Chicago Blackhawks 1983–1984 and Los Angeles Kings 1984–1989; played for CSU and graduated in 1978
- John Mallee, Major League Baseball hitting coach, Philadelphia Phillies; attended CSU
- Wayne Molis, professional basketball player who played for the New York Knicks 1966–1967; played for the Chicago State Cougars men's basketball team
- Royce Parran, professional basketball player who last played for Belfius Mons-Hainaut of the Belgian Basketball League; played for the Chicago State Cougars men's basketball team
- Clarke Rosenberg (born 1993), American-Israeli basketball player in the Israel Basketball Premier League
- Tony Weeden, professional basketball player; played for the Chicago State Cougars men's basketball team
- Willye White, first American track and field athlete to take part in five Olympics, competing on the 1956, 1960, 1964, 1968, and 1972 teams; graduated from CSU in 1976 with a degree in public health administration

== Arts and entertainment ==
- William D. Alexander, film producer; studied at CSU for several years
- John Curulewski, guitarist, vocalist and founding member of Styx; attended CSU in the late 1960s and early 1970s
- Dennis DeYoung, singer, songwriter and founding member of Styx; attended CSU in the late 1960s and early 1970s
- Christine Houston, playwright, educator, screenwriter, and creator of 227 (TV series); received bachelor's degree from CSU in 2017; former CSU instructor; received honorary doctorate from CSU in 2025
- Tina Howe, playwright of Museum, The Art of Dining, Painting Churches, Coastal Disturbances and Pride's Crossing
- RM Johnson, author of The Harris Men, The Million Dollar Divorce, Love Frustration and The Million Dollar Demise; graduated CSU
- Nicole Mitchell, jazz flautist; alumna and part-time instructor at CSU
- Chuck Panozzo, bass guitarist and founding member of Styx; attended CSU in the late 1960s and early 1970s
- John Panozzo, drummer and founding member of Styx; attended CSU in the late 1960s and early 1970s
- Law Roach, celebrity stylist and judge on America’s Next Top Model
- Kanye West, rapper and record producer; attended CSU, but did not graduate, hence his debut album title The College Dropout
- Steven Whitehurst, author, poet and educator; graduated from CSU in 1990

== Business ==
- Edith Heath (deceased), studio potter and founder of Heath Ceramics

== Government and law ==
=== U.S. government and politics ===
- Danny K. Davis (1968), member of the United States House of Representatives from Illinois's 7th congressional district since 1997
- Blanche M. Manning (deceased), former United States district judge of the United States District Court for the Northern District of Illinois; graduated from CSU in 1961 with a Bachelor of Education
- William J. Walker, major general in United States Army, commanding general of District of Columbia National Guard; earned a Master of Science degree from CSU in 1990
- Aaron S. Williams, 18th director of the Peace Corps; graduated CSU

=== State and local politics ===
- Howard B. Brookins Sr., Democratic member of the Illinois Senate, 1987–1993
- Isaac "Ike" Carothers, former alderman of the 29th Ward
- Eugenia S. Chapman, Democratic member of the Illinois House of Representatives representing the Arlington Heights area 1965–1983; graduated from CSU
- Shirley Coleman, politician who served as the 16th ward alderman 1991–2007
- Annazette Collins, Democratic member of the Illinois General Assembly serving in the House 2001–2011 and the Senate 2011–2013
- Marlow H. Colvin, Democratic member of the Illinois House of Representatives 2001–2012
- Marcus C. Evans Jr., Democratic member of the Illinois House of Representatives since April 2012
- Karen Freeman-Wilson, attorney and President and CEO of the Chicago Urban League, former Indiana Attorney General, former mayor of Gary, Indiana (conferred honorary doctoral degree by CSU in 2025)
- Michelle A. Harris, Chicago alderperson (eighth ward); earned Bachelor's degree in 2006
- Emil Jones III, Democratic member of the Illinois Senate since 2009; attended CSU
- Jeremiah E. Joyce, Democratic member of the Illinois Senate 1979–1993; earned his master's degree at CSU
- Edward Maloney, Democratic member of the Illinois Senate 2003–2013; earned master's degree from CSU
- Sharon G. Markette, Democratic member of the Illinois House of Representatives 1983–1985; received bachelor's degree in criminal justice from CSU
- Lillian Piotrowski, Democratic member of the Illinois House of Representatives 1951–1964 and member of the Cook County Board of Commissioners from 1964 until her death in 1974; attended CSU when it was Chicago Teachers College before earning her degree at Loyola University Chicago
- Al Riley, Democratic member of the Illinois House of Representatives since 2007
- Nicholas Smith, Democratic member of the Illinois House of Representatives since February 2018; graduated from CSU with a B.S. in chemistry in 2000
- Donne E. Trotter, Democratic member of the Illinois Senate 1993–2018
- Karen Yarbrough, Democratic Cook County Recorder of Deeds 2010–2024 and former member of the Illinois House of Representatives 2001–2010; earned her bachelor of business administration degree from CSU in 1973

=== Non-United States politics ===
- Bola Tinubu, president of Nigeria since 2023, received his degree in accounting from CSU in 1979

== Media ==
- Warren Ballentine, attorney and Soul 106.3 radio personality
- Leanita McClain, journalist and commentator; attended CSU before going to the Medill School of Journalism

== Faculty and staff ==
- Gwendolyn Brooks, first African American Pulitzer Prize winner, held a self-named Distinguished Professorship at CSU
- Elnora D. Daniel, president of CSU from 1998 to 2008
- Eliza Atkins Gleason, first African American to receive a doctorate in library science; associate professor of library science at CSU
- William Nicholas Hailmann, Chair of the Department of Psychology and History of Education in the early 20th century
- Francis Wayland Parker, principal of Cook County Normal School in the 19th century
- Carol Geary Schneider, professor of history at CSU prior to becoming President of the Association of American Colleges and Universities
- Henry H. Straight, taught at Cook County Normal School in 1883
- Paul Vallas, served as Chief Administrative Officer in a temporary capacity from February 2017 to January 2018
- Donda West, mother of rapper and producer Kanye West
- Pharez Whitted, director of jazz studies at Chicago State University
