= Glidden Pottery =

Mid-20th century pottery manufacturer

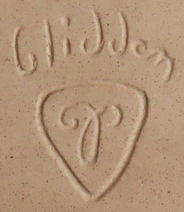
- Glidden pottery mark
- Type: Private
- Industry: Ceramics
- Founded: 1940
- Defunct: 1957
- Headquarters: Alfred, New York, United States

Glidden Pottery produced unique stoneware, dinnerware and artware in Alfred, New York from 1940 to 1957. The company was established by Glidden Parker, who had studied ceramics at the New York State College of Ceramics at Alfred University. Glidden Pottery's mid-century designs combined molded stoneware forms with hand-painted decoration. The New Yorker magazine described Glidden Pottery as "distinguished by a mat surface, soft color combinations, and, in general, well-thought-out forms that one won't see duplicated in other wares". Gliddenware was sold in leading department stores across the country. Examples of Glidden Pottery can occasionally be seen in television programs from the era, such as I Love Lucy.

== History ==
=== Origins ===
During a trip to Alfred, New York to visit family, Glidden Parker became interested in ceramics and applied to become a special graduate student at the New York College of Ceramics at Alfred University beginning in 1937. Parker studied with professors Katherine Nelson (painting), Marion Fosdick (ceramics), Don Schreckengost (ceramic industrial design) and Charles Harder (ceramics). Parker started Glidden Pottery in 1940 in the ceramics studio of Professor Fosdick on North Main Street in Alfred, before moving into its own building. The earliest designs were primarily for floral arrangements.

The ovenproof stoneware ceramic body was developed by Parker with assistance from Professors Clarence Merritt and Charles Harder at the New York State College of Ceramics at Alfred University using clays from New York, Pennsylvania and Ohio. Parker's wife Pat (Harriet Patricia Hamill) who also studied ceramics at Alfred, developed many of the glazes.

Parker's philosophy was that his pottery should combine molded shapes with hand-painted decoration, and should be available to the public at an affordable price. A 16-piece undecorated set sold for about $14.50, making it affordable yet chic. During an interview at the time of the tenth anniversary of Glidden Pottery, Parker stated, "We try to combine handwork with technical developments without destroying the intimate quality."

Parker successfully marketed his product in New York City and Gliddenware was soon for sale at major department stores across the United States such as Bloomingdale's, Bergdorf Goodman and Marshall Field's.

=== Growth ===
During the first year of the pottery's production, the staff consisted of Parker, his wife Pat (Harriet Patricia Hamill) and one employee. Total production for 1940 was 3000 pieces in 37 different shapes. By 1943 the staff had grown to between eight and ten employees. Orders for 1945 exceeded 100,000 pieces. At its peak, Glidden Pottery employed 55 people and produced 6000 pieces per week. To accommodate the growing business Parker purchased land on North Main Street in Alfred and built a new concrete block building in 1945. At this time there were over 200 shapes in production. The new facility included a 50-foot tunnel kiln which ran around the clock, except for ten days shutdown every year for repairs.

In 1945 Glidden Pottery began to receive publicity in national magazines, both as write-ups that featured the work and as props in advertisements for housewares or food. Glidden Pottery was also recognized in the Good Design shows at the Museum of Modern Art in New York and at Merchandise Mart in Chicago.

In 1949, Glidden Pottery started producing some of the ware using a RAM press, which was a newly developed process for shaping clay products by pressing clay between two molds or dies. Glidden Pottery was the second company to license this patented technology. Glidden adopted a new logo at this time where the initials G and P were fashioned into a ram's head. RAM pressed pieces were hand-finished and hand-decorated. The RAM press resulted in changes to the product line. Some older designs were discontinued or modified to be better suited to RAM pressing. New designs were added to take advantage of the capabilities of the new process. While the RAM Press was a more automated production method, Glidden Pottery continued to be hand-finished and hand-decorated, in keeping with Parker’s design philosophy.

Paul Secon learned about three barns stocked with second-run Glidden pottery through his wife and negotiated with Parker to buy their contents, which he bought for a dollar each at $2,500 and resold from a small storefront he leased for the purpose in Manhattan. He named his business the Pottery Barn after the sheds that Parker had originally stored the ware in.

In 1954, Lucille Ball and Desi Arnaz bought service for 48 for use in their home in California. Glidden Pottery was also used in Lucy and Ricky's New York City apartment in I Love Lucy.

In 1955, Parker opened Glidden Galleries in Alfred, New York to be a showroom for Glidden Pottery and an outlet for discontinued pieces and seconds. It also provided gallery space for other artists to display their work. Glidden Galleries remained in business until 1970.

=== Factory closing ===
In the late 1950s, imported pottery from Italy and Japan began to flood the US market which had a major impact on American pottery companies. Despite continued critical success with award-winning designs, Glidden Pottery was not able to compete with imports and ceased production in December 1957.

== Designers ==
Glidden Parker was the principal designer for the company he founded and is credited with the design of all of the shapes until 1950.

Fong Chow (b. Tianjin, China, 1923–2012) joined Glidden Pottery as a designer in 1953 after graduating from Alfred University and continued with the company until it closed in 1957. In addition to designing shapes and decoration, Fong Chow developed glazes and came up with the names for the product lines he developed.

Sergio Dello Strologo (b. Italy, 1928–1999) designed the Alfred Stoneware dinnerware line in 1956 with glazes in Saffron, Cayenne and Parsley by Fong Chow. Dello Strologo had previously worked with Russel Wright.

Other designers included Fred Press (mid-1950s) and Philip Secrest (1950). One employee noted that the decorators were allowed to develop decorations that sometimes went into production.

== Awards and museum exhibitions ==
When Glidden Pottery was in operation, its designs were recognized in museum exhibitions.

- Ceramic National exhibitions 1947, 1949, 1951, and 1952. Syracuse Museum of Fine Arts (now the Everson Museum). Purchase prize in 1949 for "best ceramic design suitable for mass production."
- Good Design, September 22 – November 29, 1953, Museum of Modern Art.
- Good Design, November 21, 1950 – January 28, 1951, Museum of Modern Art
- 100 Useful Objects of Fine Design (available under $100), September 16, 1947 – January 25, 1948, Museum of Modern Art
- Useful Objects, November 26, 1946 – January 26, 1947, Museum of Modern Art

A major exhibition of Glidden Pottery was presented in 2001.

- Glidden Pottery, April 12 – September 27, 2001, Schein-Joseph Museum of Ceramic Art at Alfred (now the Alfred Ceramic Art Museum), Alfred University, Alfred, NY.

Glidden Pottery can be found in the permanent collections of several museums:

- Alfred Ceramic Art Museum
- Brooklyn Museum
- Cooper-Hewett
- Everson Museum
- International Museum of Dinnerware Design
