= International Museum of Dinnerware Design =

Design museum in Kingston, New York

The International Museum of Dinnerware Design
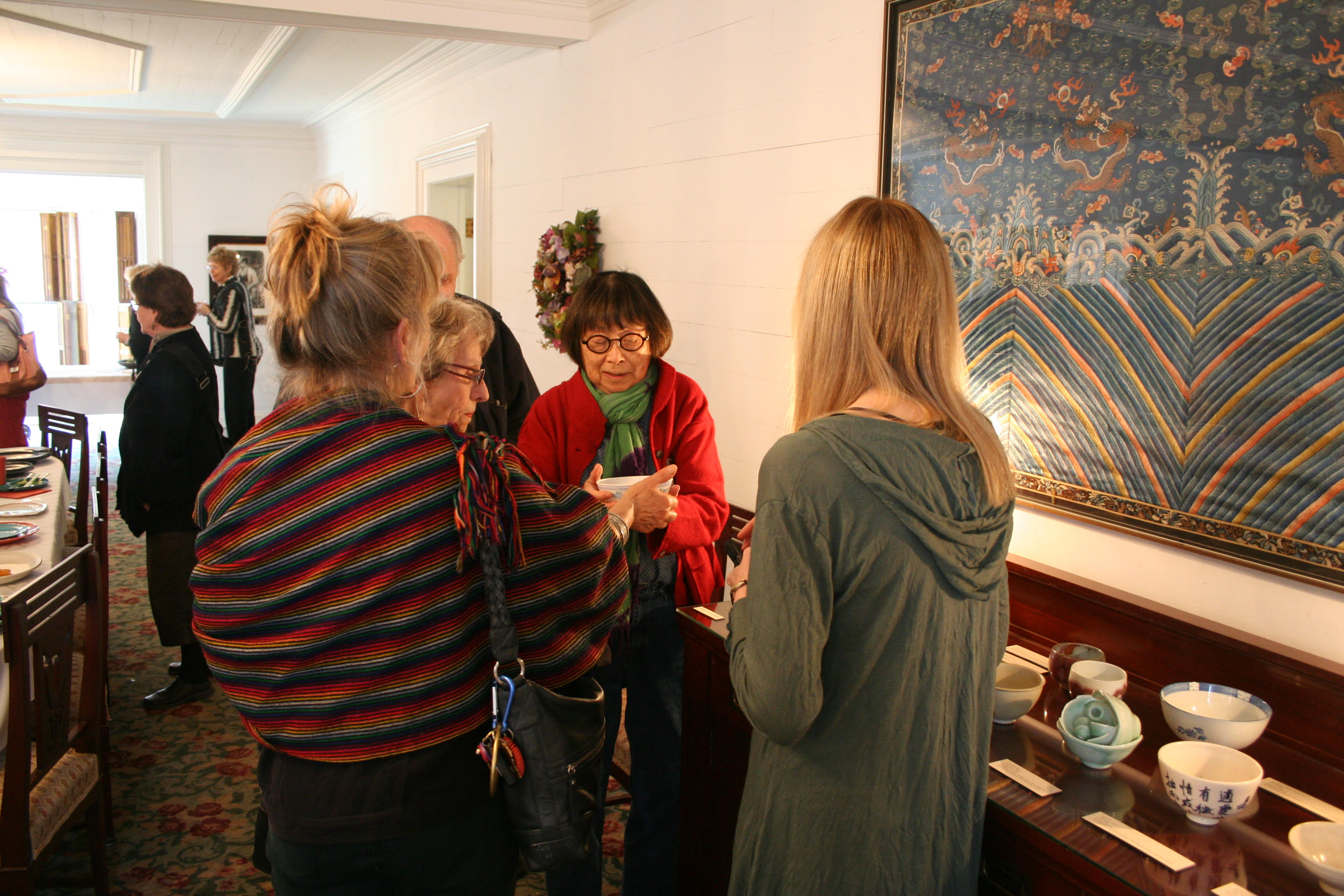
- Guests speaking with Margaret Carney [right], founding director and chief curator of IMoDD
- Former name: The Dinnerware Museum
- Established: 2012
- Location: Kingston, New York
- Collection size: 9,000+ objects
- Founder: Margaret Carney
- Director: Margaret Carney
- Website: http://dinnerwaremuseum.org/main, director@dinnerwaremuseum.org

The International Museum of Dinnerware Design (IMoDD) is a design museum located in Kingston, New York. It was established in 2012 by Margaret L. Carney. IMoDD is a 501(c)(3) organization that "collects, preserves, and celebrates masterpieces of the tabletop genre created by leading artists and designers worldwide. Through its collections, exhibitions, and educational programming," IMoDD's mission statement says, "it provides a window on the varied cultural and societal attitudes toward food and dining and commemorates the objects that exalt and venerate the dining experience." IMoDD has over 9,000 objects in its permanent collection, consisting of work by contemporary artists as well as the leading designers for industry, with an additional focus on fine art referencing dining.

== History ==
Margaret L. Carney established the International Museum of Dinnerware Design in Ann Arbor in 2012, based on her love of the work of the leading designers for industry, including that of Eva Zeisel, Glidden Parker, Russel Wright, Ben Seibel, Fong Chow, Viktor and Don Schreckengost, along with functional pottery by contemporary artists. In the late 1990s, after organizing special exhibitions and writing catalogues on the topic of dinnerware, Carney began to explore the idea of creating a unique museum devoted to the celebration of dinnerware. In order to test public interest, she aimed to hold a special exhibition in New York City with Corning Inc. titled "Great Moments in Dinnerware" and/or "You Are What You Eat Off Of" in 2002; unfortunately, the September 11 attacks occurred and Corning closed its exhibition space in Manhattan. On December 30, 2011, designer Eva Zeisel died, prompting Carney to move forward with her museum plans, as she had shared her dream with Eva, who supported the idea. In 2012, Carney moved to Ann Arbor, filed for incorporation, and applied for 501(c)(3) status.

Because of the cost of commercial space in Ann Arbor, the museum lacked a dedicated exhibition space. As a result, public exhibitions of the museum's collection appeared in curated exhibits at other facilities, particularly in Ann Arbor and Ypsilanti. IMoDD's pop-up exhibits typically last from 3 days to 5 months. For example, one of its first exhibits was “Whetting Your Appetite,” held in 2013 at SOFA Chicago (Sculpture, Objects, Functional Art + Design).

In January 2017, the museum's name was changed from The Dinnerware Museum to The International Museum of Dinnerware Design in order to better reflect the mission of capturing dining history worldwide and celebrating dining memories, with a focus on design as a key element. While there are currently no paid employees at the museum, it has had interns from the University of Michigan's Museum Studies program as well as other volunteers. Carney continues to serve as Director and Chief Curator.

In April 2024, Director Margaret Carney announced that the museum was moving to its first brick-and-mortar home in Kingston, New York. According to Carney, the new space will allow for exhibitions and programming to be available all the time, rather than through pop-up exhibits. Carney notes that Kingston is a thriving arts community and is located near the homes and studios of Russel Wright and Eva Zeisel.

Since its founding, IMoDD has put on biennial national juried, invitational, and historical exhibitions. These exhibitions include "The Art of High Chair Fine Dining" (2014), "Cake" (2016), "Butter" (2019), "Breakfast" (2021), and "Entomophagous Dining" (2023).

== Collections ==
The International Museum of Dinnerware Design "celebrates a significant aspect of our daily lives. The permanent collection features international dinnerware from ancient to futuristic times," and the objects are made of an array of different materials – from ceramic, glass, and metal to plastic, lacquer, fiber, paper, wood, yarn, and more. The collection features historic dinnerware made by the leading designers for industry, including work by Eva Zeisel, Russel Wright, Ben Seibel, Arne Jacobsen, Glidden Parker, Frederick Carder, Frederick Hurten Rhead, Viktor and Don Schreckengost, Michael Lax, A.D. Copier, Fong Chow, and Shinichiro Ogata. The collection also includes masterpieces by hundreds of contemporary artists such as Warren MacKenzie, Marie Woo, Val Cushing, John Neely, Josh DeWeese, Léopold Foulem, Ruth Duckworth, Chris Staley, Jeff Oestreich, and Otto and Vivika Heino.

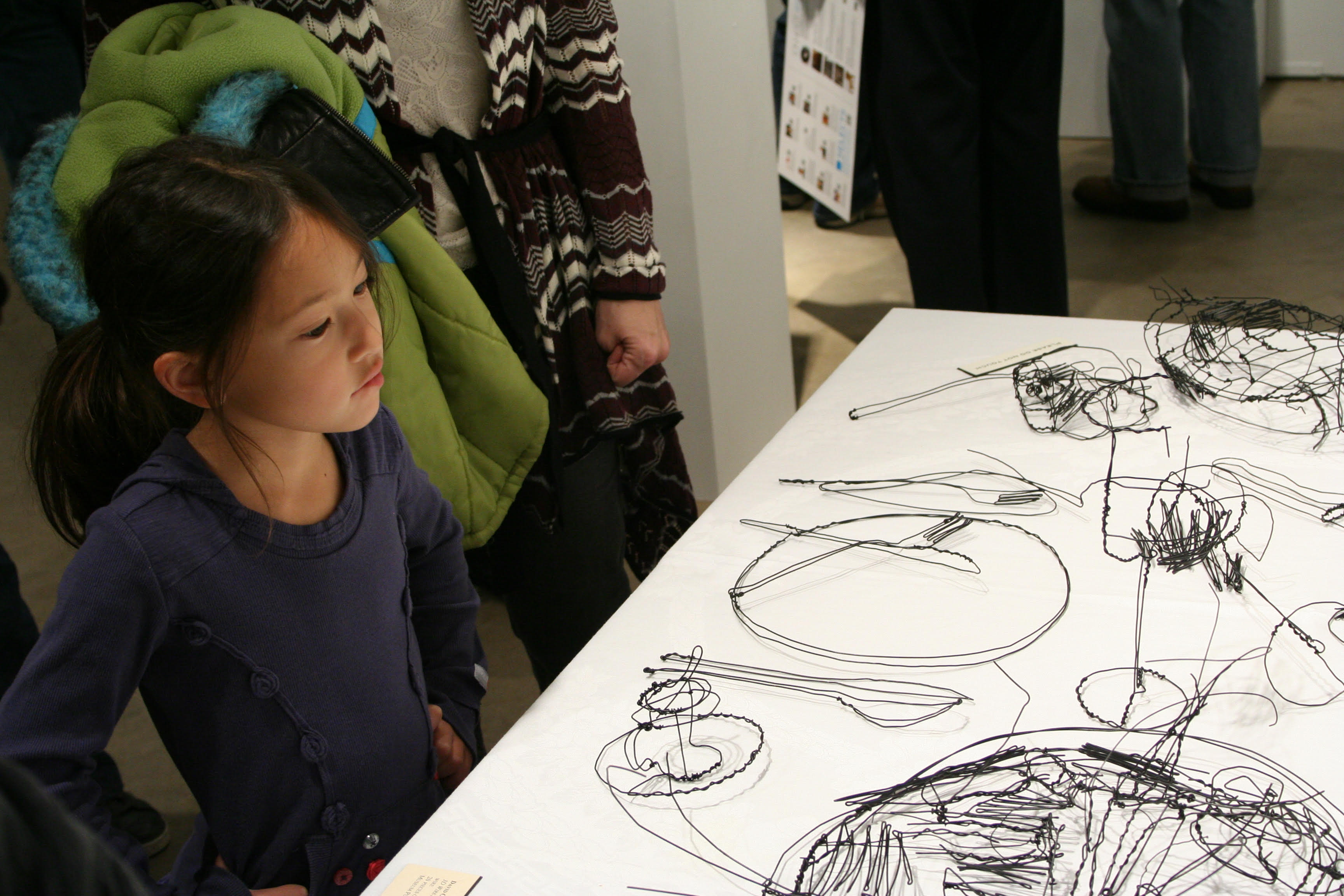
A young girl looks at David Oliviera's "Wire Scribble Sculpture" at an IMoDD exhibition.

Along with contemporary and historic dinnerware, IMoDD collects non-functional fine art that references the dining experience, including art made by Roy Lichtenstein, Sandy Skoglund ("The Cocktail Party"), William Parry ("Knife Fork Spoon" ceramic sculpture), and David Oliviera ("Wire Scribble Sculpture"). IMoDD has over 9,000 objects in its collection.

== Exhibitions and educational programming ==
The International Museum of Dinnerware Design has office and storage facilities in Ann Arbor, but without a dedicated museum building, it has partnered with other local museums, galleries, and libraries on more than twenty exhibitions since its founding in 2012. Three successful exhibitions have been held at SOFA (Sculpture, Objects, Functional Art + Design). Other IMoDD exhibits include:

- "Unforgettable Dinnerware" at the Ladies Literary Club, Ypsilanti, MI (2013), an inaugural exhibition.
- "Whetting Your Appetite" at SOFA Chicago 2013, Navy Pier, Chicago, IL (2013).
- "Three Courses" at the Museum on Main Street, Ann Arbor, MI (2014).
- "Coffee," at Zingerman's Coffee Company, Ann Arbor, MI (2015).
- "The Art of High Chair Fine Dining" at the Ladies Literary Club, Ypsilanti, MI (2014), a national juried, invitational, and historic exhibition.
- "TEA" at Zingerman's Coffee Company and ZingTrain, Ann Arbor, MI (2015).
- "Time for Dinner," in collaboration with weaver Mary Underwood at Front Porch Textiles, Ann Arbor, MI (2015).
- "Delicious Dishes," at the Riverside Arts Center, Ypsilanti, MI (2015).
- "A Place at the Table," at the University of Michigan Health System, Gifts of Art Gallery, Ann Arbor, MI (2015).
- "Thirst Quenchers" at the Ann Arbor District Library, Ann Arbor, MI (2016).
- "Cake" at the Museum on Main Street, Ann Arbor, MI (2016), a national juried, invitational, and historic exhibition.
- "a la carte: from the studio to the table" at Washtenaw Community College, Ann Arbor, MI (2017).
- "Dining Mid-Century" at the Stone Chalet, Ann Arbor, MI (2017).
- "Barware" at Morgan & York, Ann Arbor, MI (2017).
- "Timeless Dinnerware Design" at SOFA Chicago 2017, Navy Pier, Chicago, IL (2017).
- "Dining In Dining Out" at the Stone Chalet, Ann Arbor, MI (2018).
- "Unapologetic Dinnerware: a brief history of disposable dinnerware" at Concordia University, Ann Arbor, MI (2018).
- "Tabletop Stories," presented by IMoDD and the Ann Arbor District Library, at the Ann Arbor District Library, Ann Arbor, MI (2019).
- "Butter" at the Museum on Main Street, Ann Arbor, MI (2019), a national juried, invitational, and historic exhibition.
- "Dinnerware + Design + Decoration" at SOFA Chicago 2019, Navy Pier, Chicago, IL (2019).
- "Sculptural Dinnerware" at the Gifts of Art Gallery, Michigan Medicine, University of Michigan, Ann Arbor, MI (2020).
- During the COVID-19 pandemic, IMoDD exhibited "Delicious Dish Distractions," pairing items of its collection with various food items, including pasta, a burger with fries, and grilled cheese. This online exhibit was posted to Facebook, Instagram, and IMoDD's website (2020).
- "One Table Oodles of Dishes" an interactive virtual exhibition (2021).
- "Breakfast" at the Museum on Main Street, Ann Arbor, MI (2021), a national juried, invitational, and historic exhibition.
- "Colorful California Dinnerware" at the Gifts of Art Gallery, Michigan Medicine, University of Michigan, Ann Arbor, MI (2021).
- "Holiday Dining" a virtual exhibition, installed just long enough to be photographed (2021).
- "Wedding China" a virtual exhibition consisting of some of the IMoDD collection as well as photos sent in by IMoDD's friends and supporters.
- "A Perfect Pairing of Cookbooks and Dinenrware," a collaboration between Director Margaret Carney and Curator Juli McLoon, at Hatcher Library, University of Michigan, Ann Arbor, MI (2022).
- "Travel Dining" at Gifts of Art Gallery, Michigan Medicine, University of Michigan, Ann Arbor, MI (2022).
- "Dish Night at the Movies" at the Michigan Theater, Ann Arbor, MI (2023).
- "Dining on Modernism" a special exhibition at the Palm Springs Modernism Show (Modernism Week), Palm Springs, CA (2023).
- "Entomophagous Dining" at the Museum on Main Street, Ann Arbor, MI (2023), a national juried, invitational, and historic exhibition.

The museum hosts educational programming to accompany its exhibits, including public lectures hosted by SOFA Chicago in 2012 and 2013, NCECA (National Council on Education for the Ceramic Arts) in 2013 and 2016, the Wedgwood Society of Washington, D.C., the Haviland International Foundation, the Washtenaw County Historical Society, the Culinary Historians of Ann Arbor, the Ann Arbor District Library, University of Michigan Retirees, the Culinary Historians of Chicago, the Hall China Convention, and other specialized groups. Tours have been provided during nearly all of the public exhibitions, along with occasional behind-the-scenes tours of office and storage facilities.

Recently, the International Museum of Dinnerware Design has teamed up with the Ann Arbor District Library to present "Unforgettable Dinnerware," an educational, virtual series of lectures from special guests. Events cover a wide variety of topics:

- "Unforgettable Dinnerware: a Behind-the-Scenes Tour of the International Museum of Dinnerware Design" presented by Dr. Margaret Carney (March 2022).
- "Eva Zeisel: an Unforgettable Designer, an Unforgettable Life" presented by Jean Richards, Eva Zeisel's daughter, and Scott Vermillion (April 2022).
- "The Unforgettable Dinnerware of Julia Galloway, with a Focus on Her Endangered Species Series" presented by Julia Galloway (May 2022).
- "Unforgettable Dinnerware: Setting the Standard for Setting the Table: Modern Women Textile Designers" presented by Lindsay Prachet and Gregory Spinner (June 2022).
- "American Mid-Century Modern Dinnerware with Michael E. Pratt" presented by Michael Pratt (September 2022).
- "Plastic Dishes on the Table: America’s Love Affair with Melamine in the Mid-20th Century" presented by Dr. Margaret Carney (October 2022).
- "A Place at the Table: Heath Ceramics and the Legacy of Edith Heath" presented by Julie Muñiz (November 2022).
- "Unforgettable Dinnerware: Saenger Porcelain" presented by Peter Saenger (December 2022).
- "How “Dish Night” at the Movies Giveaways Saved Hollywood" presented by Kathy Fuller-Seeley (January 2023).
- "Contemporary Black American Ceramic Artists" presented by donald a clark and Chotsani Elaine Dean (February 2023).
- "Degenerate Dinnerware: Shape and Decoration" presented by Rolf Achilles (March 2023).
- "Insect Foods: Back to the Future?" presented by Gina Hunter, Ph.D. (April 2023).
- "A Dinnerware Collector's Journey" presented by Scott Vermillion (May 2023).

== Newsletter ==
Since 2015, the International Museum of Dinnerware Design has published an annual membership newsletter, MENU, which details the exhibitions, recent acquisitions, and educational programs IMoDD put on that year. As of 2022, IMoDD had published eight iterations of the newsletter.
