= Secon =

Secon is a surname. Notable people with the surname include:

- Lucas Secon (born 1970), Danish record producer and songwriter, son of Paul
- Paul Secon (1916–2007), American entrepreneur and songwriter
