= Pottery Barn =

American home furnishing store chain

- Type: Subsidiary
- Industry: Home furnishing
- Founded: 1949; 77 years ago
- Founders: Paul Secon, Morris Secon
- Headquarters: San Francisco, California, United States
- Number of locations: 184 (2022)
- Key people: Jennifer Kellor, President
- Products: Furniture and decor, bedding, bath, lighting, rugs, and windows
- Parent: The Gap (1984–1986); Williams-Sonoma, Inc. (1986–present)
- Website: www.potterybarn.com

Pottery Barn is an American upscale home furnishing store chain and e-commerce company, with retail stores in the United States, Canada, Mexico and Australia. Pottery Barn is a wholly owned subsidiary of Williams-Sonoma, Inc.

The company is headquartered in San Francisco, California. Pottery Barn also operates several specialty stores such as Pottery Barn Kids and Pottery Barn Teen. It has three retail catalogues: the traditional Pottery Barn catalogue; Pottery Barn Bed + Bath to focus on its bed and bath lines; and one for outdoor furniture. Pottery Barn paper catalogs were discontinued at the end of 2024.

== Early history ==
The Pottery Barn was co-founded in 1949 by Paul Secon and his brother Morris after Morris's wife purchased some Glidden Pottery pieces at a yard sale in their native Rochester, New York. Morris thought there would be a strong market for the pottery and contacted its founder, Glidden Parker, who told Secon that he had three barns full of second-run pieces in Alfred, New York. Secon agreed to buy 2,500 pieces of stoneware for $2,500 and the brothers drove the inventory to their small rented storefront in Chelsea, Manhattan, which they named the Pottery Barn after Glidden's sheds. After their store was mentioned in a 1952 The New Yorker article the business experienced a rush.

Paul sold his share in 1966 and Morris sold his to R. Hoyt Chapin and Walton Brush in 1968. Chapin and Brush expanded the business to include five stores in NYC, one in Stamford, Ct. one in Hartford Ct. and several franchise stores in New Jersey, Pennsylvania and California before selling to The Gap in 1984.

The company was acquired by Williams-Sonoma, Inc. in 1986. Growth continued until the Great Recession. Its mail-order catalog was first published in 1987. In 1999, the company introduced Pottery Barn Kids as a premium children's home furnishing and accessories brand. By 2000, the company had launched an e-commerce site for quick ordering process.

Pottery Barn Teen, the first home retailer to focus on teenagers, was launched in 2003. The first Pottery Barn Teen store opened in Georgia in 2009, as well as in New York City and Chicago. The store has a sub-brand Pottery Barn Dorm for young people starting college life.

== Later history ==
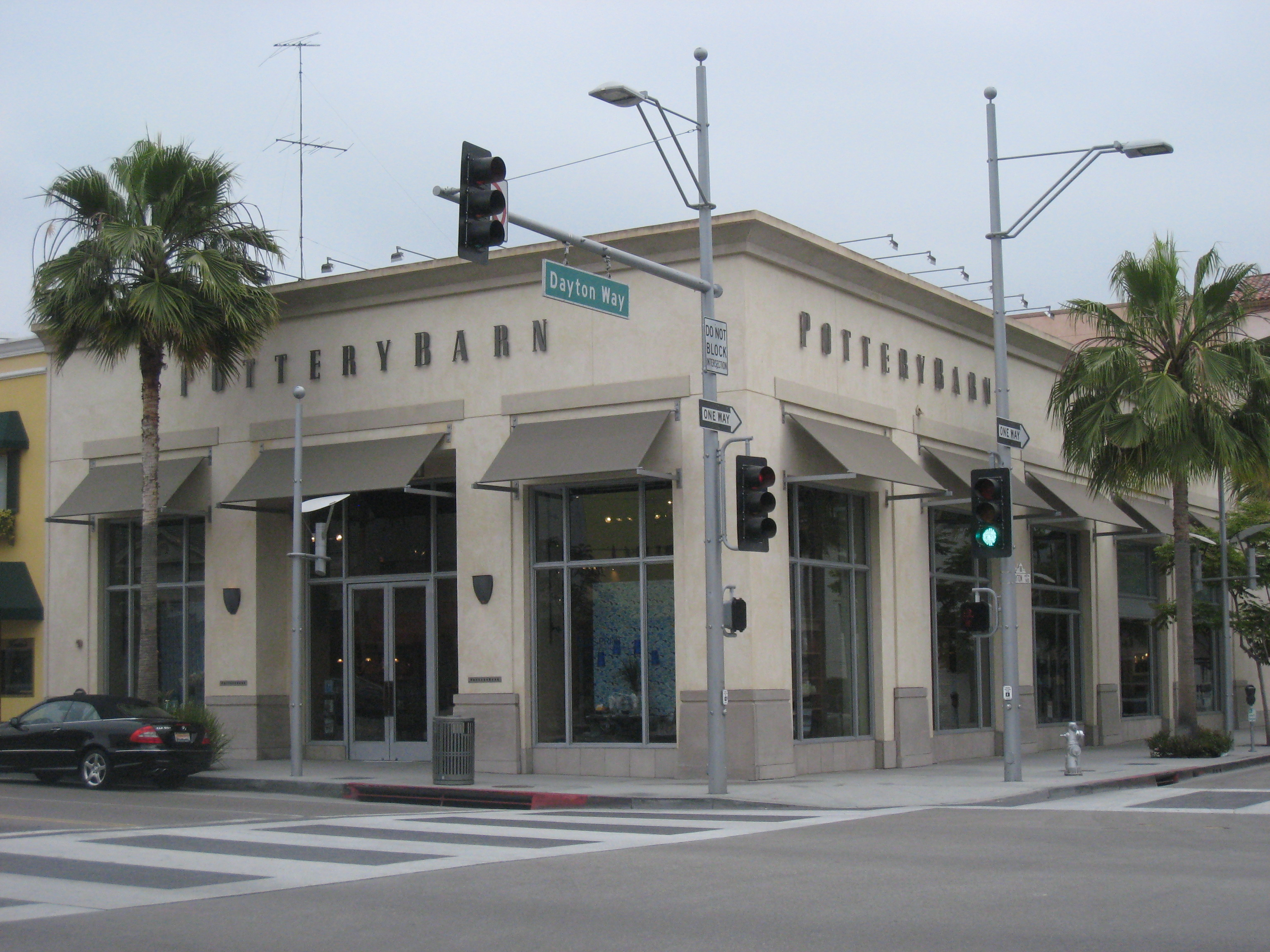
The Pottery Barn store in Beverly Hills, California

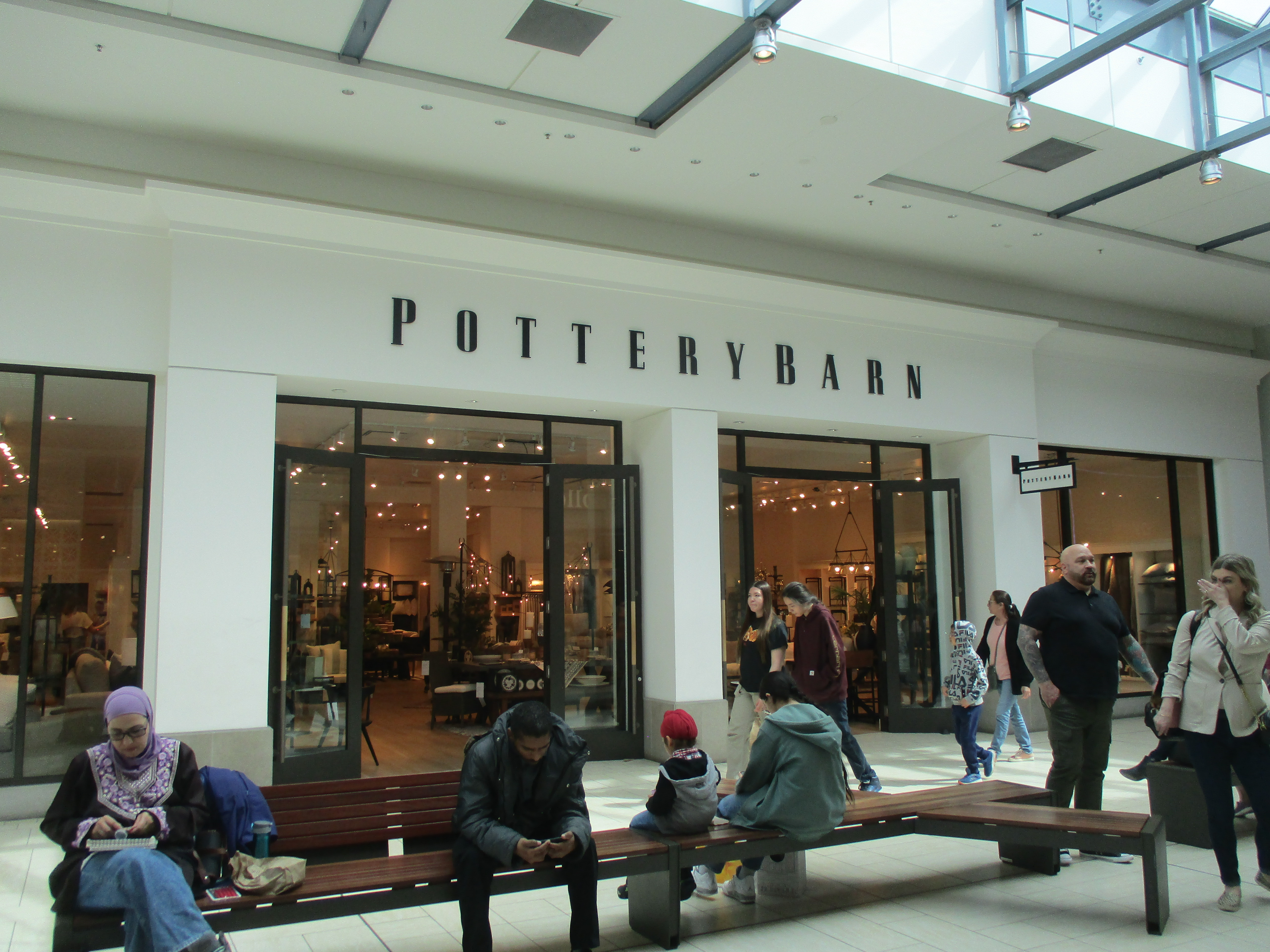
Pottery Barn in Calgary

In 2017, the company introduced an augmented reality app for iOS that allowed users to virtually place Pottery Barn products into a room and save room design ideas. It also announced PB Apartment, a small-space furnishings line, for millennials.

In 2018, Pottery Barn Kids partnered with John Lewis which marked the first appearance of the brand in the United Kingdom. Its shop-in-shops featured furniture and accessories for nurseries. Ireland became the first European country to hold the franchise for Pottery Barn Kids in 2019. Pottery Barn Teens partnered with Aquafil on the Spring 2020 collection "Watercolor Dots" rug, which uses regenerated nylon made from waste gathered in the ocean and other bodies of water.

== In popular culture ==
Pottery Barn is referenced a number of times in Friends. For instance, when Rachel buys furniture for Phoebe's apartment (which she is staying in at the time), and claims it's all authentically old furniture, rather than being from Pottery Barn.

Another example is in Seinfeld, Kramer talks with Jerry about how he is receiving too many catalogs from Pottery Barn. He saves the collected catalogs, takes them, and throws them into the store.

Sheldon Cooper references it often in The Big Bang Theory.

A Pottery Barn retail store is seen situated next to Felix Unger's Manhattan F.U. Enterprises office/studio in The Odd Couple's first season in 1970.

Pottery Barn is referenced in the Broadway musical Dear Evan Hansen, as a location where the title character works. He informs another character that he can get her and her family a discount in "overpriced home décor."

In the season 3 episode of the American family sitcom Boy Meets World titled "What I Meant to Say", Corey Matthews confesses to his girlfriend, Topanga Lawrence, that he loves her. Eric Matthews, Corey's older brother, then under social pressure, tells his girlfriend, Christie, that he loves her as well. This leads Christie to take Eric on a trip to Pottery Barn, which Eric laments. While at Pottery Barn, Eric and Christie buy a ceramic cat and napkin holders.

The brand's "Found" collection sells vintage items from around the world. The company has partnered on collections with a number of pop cultural brands such as Harry Potter, Star Wars, Frozen, Thomas & Friends, Fantastic Beasts, and Friends.
