= 2008 CrossFit Games =

Athletic competition

- Venue: CrossFit Ranch
- Location: Aromas, California
- Dates: July 5–6, 2008

Champions
- Men: Jason Khalipa
- Women: Caity Matter
- Team: CrossFit Oakland

The 2008 CrossFit Games were the second annual CrossFit Games to be held following the inaugural Games in 2007. The Games were held on July 5–6, 2008, on a ranch in Aromas, California, United States.

As with the first Games, there was no qualification process for athletes wishing to compete in the Games. The number of participating athletes was limited to 300 on a first-come first-serve basis, and the number of competition events increased to four.

The men's competition was won by Jason Khalipa, the women's by Caity Matter, and the Affiliate Cup was awarded to CrossFit Oakland. Each winner of the individual events won $1,500. The first documentary film of the Games, Every Second Counts, was made for this year's Games.

== Events ==
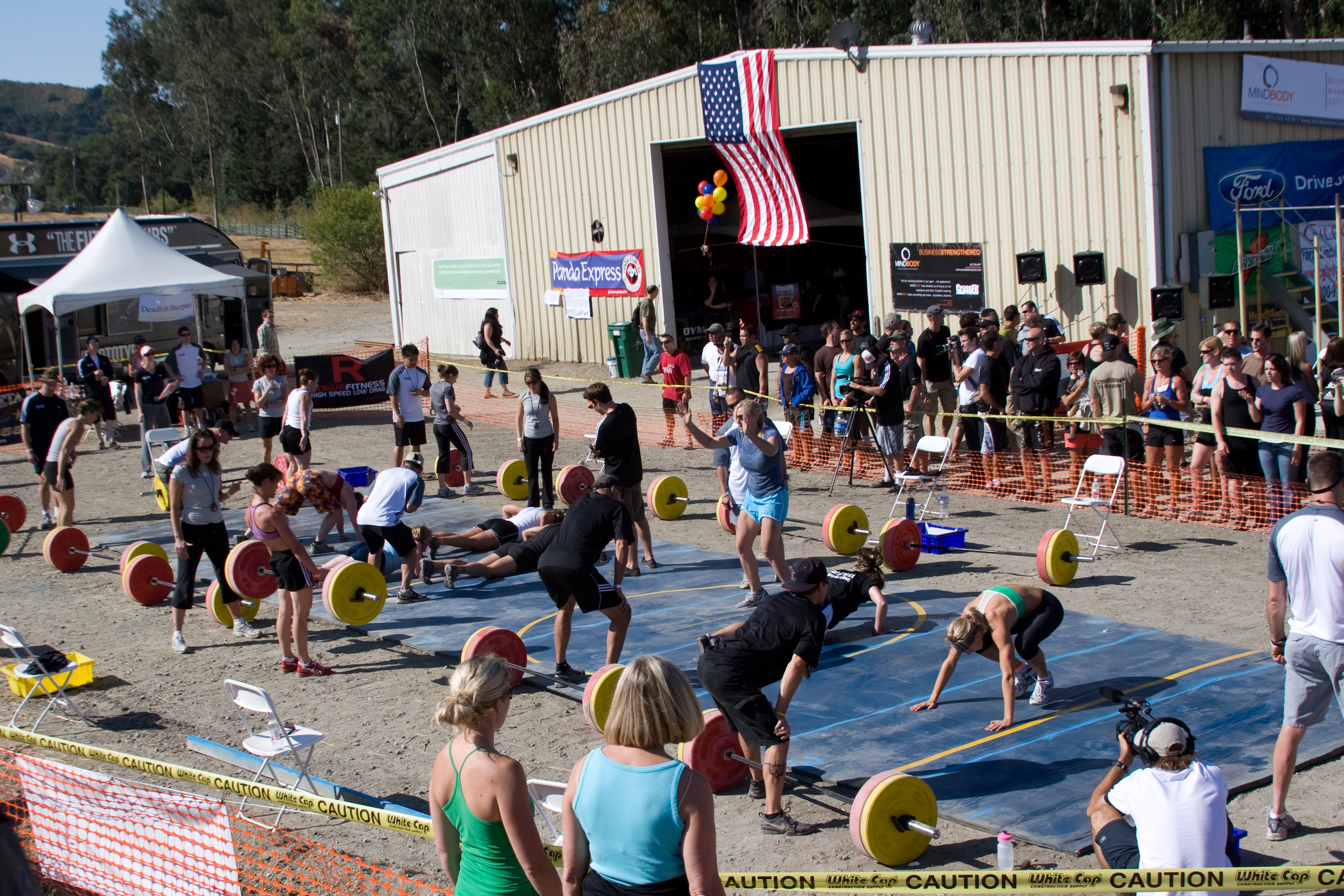
2008 CrossFit Games at the ranch in Aromas; the deadlifts and burpees event

The first three events for the second CrossFit Games took place on Saturday July 5, 2008, and the final event was held the following day. The winners were determined by the lowest cumulative time taken to complete the four events. The Affiliate Cup was awarded to the affiliate with lowest combined time for its top two men and top two women. The scoring format for the 2008 games is reflected in the title of the documentary film made of this year's Games, Every Second Counts.

=== Workout A ===
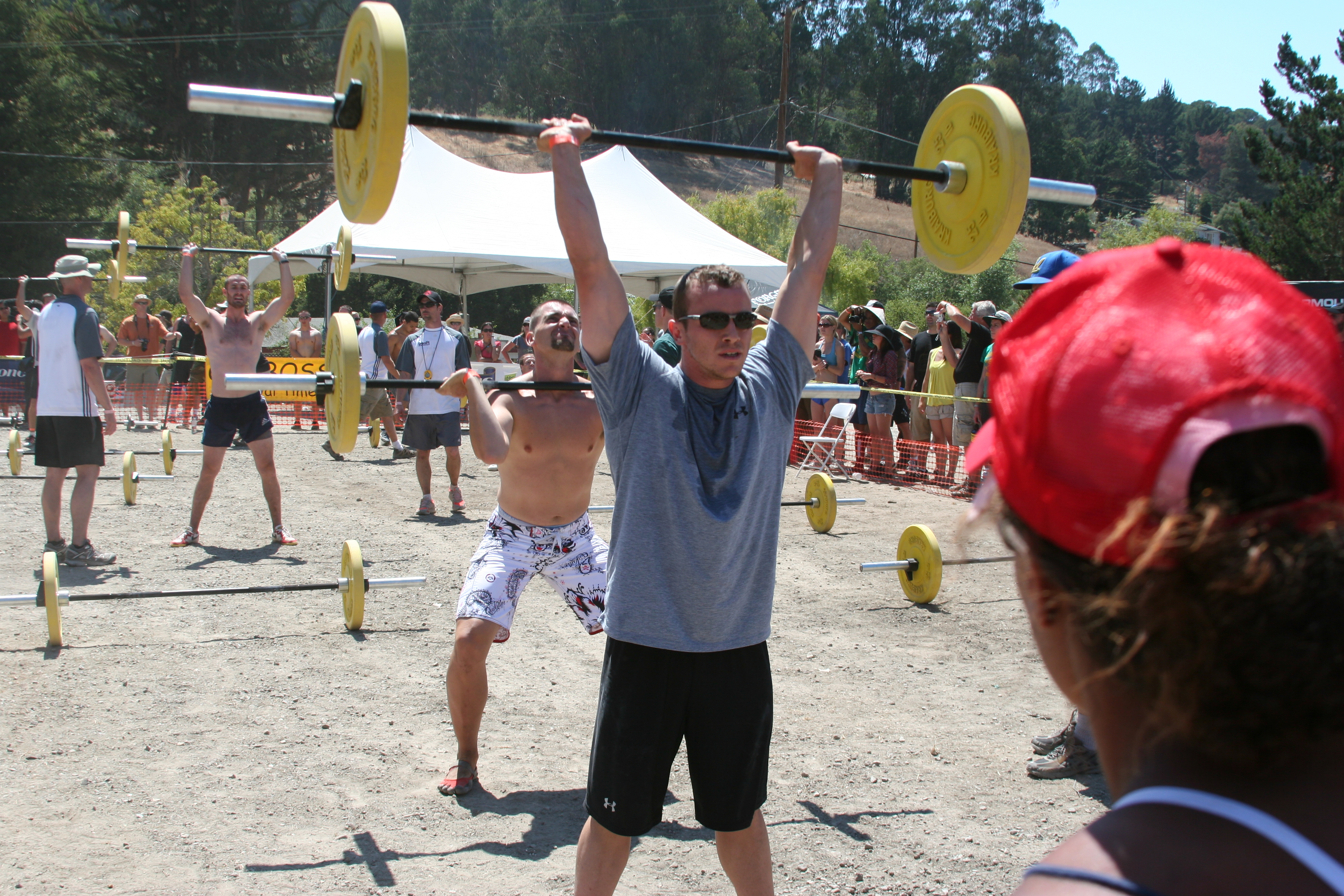
The thrusters and chest-to-bar pull-ups event

Fran – Three rounds of thrusters (a front squat into push press) and chest-to-bar pull-ups. Each round has a decreasing number of repetitions starting with 21 thrusters and 21 pull-ups then progressing to 15 repetitions of each for round two and nine repetitions for the final round. The weight for the thruster was 95 pounds (43 kilograms) for the men and 65 pounds (29 kilograms) for the women. The Fran event was won by Chris Spealler for the men, Linda Leipper for the women.

=== Workout B ===
Five rounds of five deadlifts and ten burpees. The weight for the deadlifts was 275 pounds (125 kilograms) for the men and 185 pounds (84 kilograms) for the women. Matt Chan and Libby Dibiase won their respective men's and women's Deadlift/Burpee event.

=== The Hill Run ===
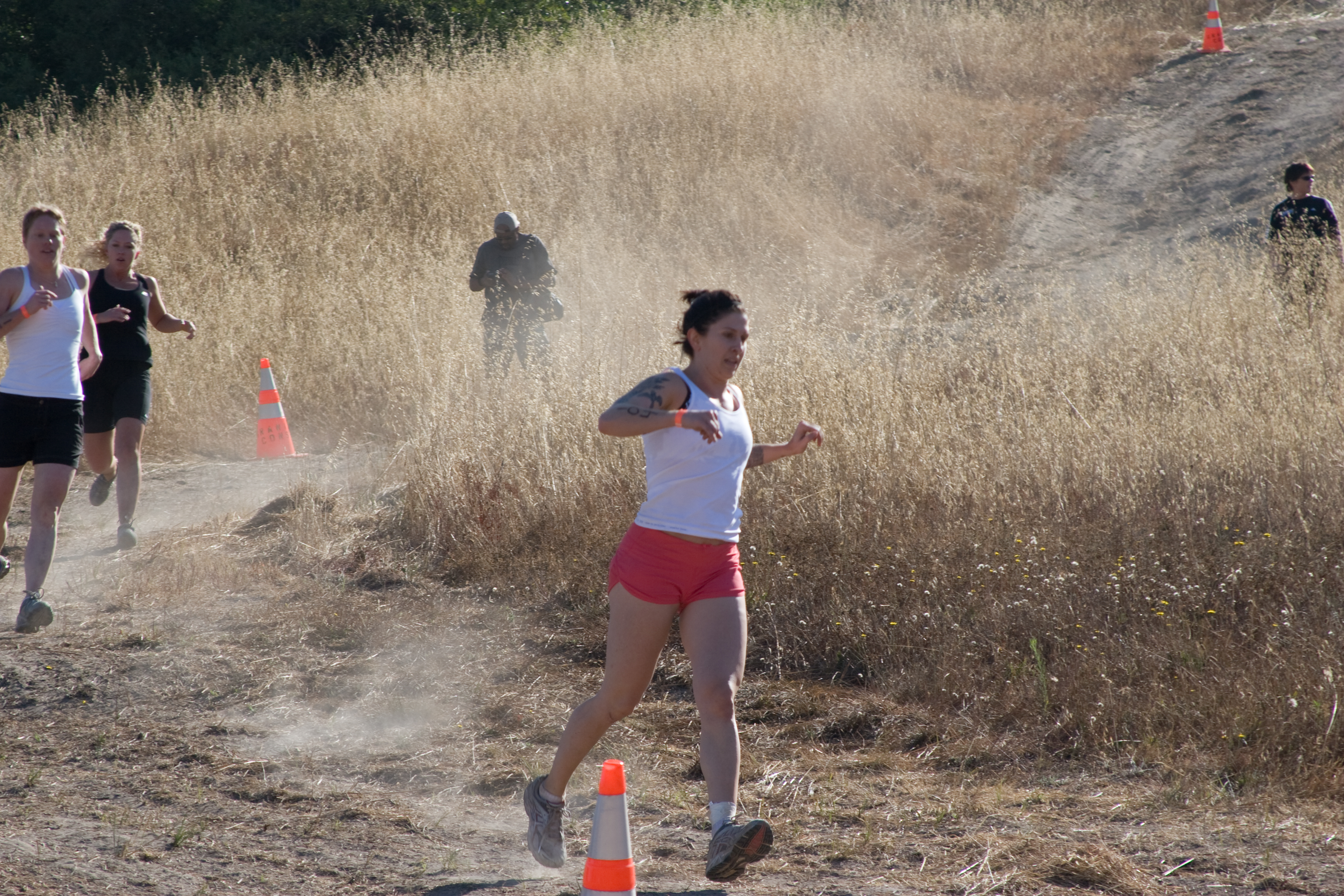
The Hill Run event at the CrossFit Games

A steep trail run over rough terrain approximately 750 meters (2,460 feet) in length. Eric O'Connor won the men's Hill Run, Aqueelah Tillman won the women's.

=== Sunday's Final Event ===
The Squat Grace event comprised thirty squat clean and jerks. The weights used were 155 pounds (70 kilograms) for the men and 100 pounds (45 kilograms) for the women. The participant's starts were staggered so that the competitors set off with the time differentials of their previous days combined score. This allowed the spectators to see who the overall winners were since they would finish the event first.

Jason Khalipa had the best cumulative time of 13 minutes 17 seconds over the four men's events. Caity Matter won the Squat Grace and was the overall winner with a total time of 19 minutes 10 seconds in the women's competition. CrossFit Oakland won the Affiliate Cup based on the performance of team members in the individual events.

== Podium finishers ==
| Place | Men | Women | Affiliate |
|---|---|---|---|
| 1st | Jason Khalipa | Caity Matter | CrossFit Oakland |
| 2nd | Josh Everett | Tanya Wagner | CrossFit Park City |
| 3rd | Jeremy Thiel | Gillian Mounsey | CrossFit Vancouver |
