= William Nicholas =

William Nicholas may refer to:

- William Nicholas (officer) (1785–1812), English officer in the British Army
- William H. Nicholas (1892–1984), American politician who served twice as the Lieutenant Governor of Iowa

== See also ==
- William Nicholas Darnell (1776–1865), English cleric, academic and antiquarian
- William Nicholas Searancke (1817–1904), New Zealand surveyor, land purchase commissioner, resident magistrate and land agent
- William Nicholas Keogh (1817–1878), Irish politician and judge
- William Nicholas Hailmann (1836-1920), American educator
- William Nicholas Selig (1864–1948), American film pioneer
- William Nicholas Willis (1858–1922), Australian politician
- William Nicholas Stone Courtney (1929–2011), British actor
- William Nicholas Straub House, historic house in Arkansas
