= Schreckengost =

Schreckengost is a surname. Notable people with the surname include:

- Don Schreckengost (1910–2001), American ceramicist
- Ossee Schreckengost (1875–1914), American baseball player
- Viktor Schreckengost (1906–2008), American artist and industrial designer
