= Sharon G. Markette =

American politician

Sharon G. Markette (born February 5, 1956) is an American politician.

Born in Montgomery, Alabama, Markette received her bachelor's degree in criminal justice from Chicago State University. She then worked for the Illinois Department of Employment Security. She lived in Chicago, Illinois.

In 1983, Markette was appointed to the Illinois House of Representatives replacing Ozie Hutchins who resigned from the Illinois General Assembly when he was convicted of extortion. Markette served until 1985 and was a Democrat.
