= Burnside Shops =

Coordinates: 41°43′04″N 87°36′35″W

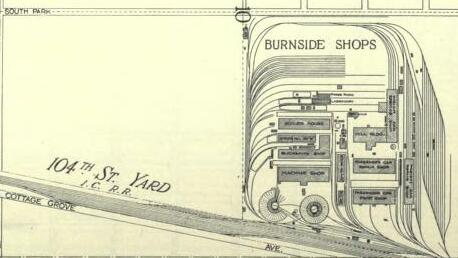
A map of the shops circa 1910

The Burnside Shops were a major shop for maintenance of locomotives and railroad cars in Chicago, Illinois. The shops were owned and operated by the Illinois Central Railroad.

The Illinois Central maintained a presence in Burnside since at least 1862, when it built a station there.

In 1968, the Illinois Central agreed to sell the site to Chicago State University. Burnside was replaced by new facilities built at Markham Yard in Harvey and Homewood, Illinois.
