= Fireclay Tile =

American architectural tile company

- Industry: Architectural tile manufacturing, interior design products
- Founded: 1986; 39 years ago in San Jose, California
- Founder: Paul Burns, Jeff Alvord, Martin Zepeda, Albert Batista
- Headquarters: Aromas, California, US
- Website: https://www.fireclaytile.com/

Fireclay Tile is a North American architectural tile company. Founded in 1986 by Paul Burns, Jeff Alvord, Martin Zepeda, and Albert Batista. Fireclay is known for designing and hand-making tile in Northern California, while actively incorporating environmentally sustainable practices.

Originally based out of San Jose, California, and with manufacturing headquarters in Aromas, California since 1992, and an additional showroom have been located in San Francisco, California since January 2014. In 2020, the company received approvals to expand their Aromas campus from the San Benito County Planning Commission which will include 44,000 square feet across three buildings.

== History ==
After working at Stonelight Tile, Inc in San Jose, Paul Burns Jeff Alvord, Martin Zepeda, and Albert Batista created Fireclay Tile in San Jose in 1986. The following year Fireclay developed its own product line, called Colonia, which consisted of 4x4 and 6x6 tiles and corresponding trim pieces. In 1988 Fireclay began to manufacture their own lead-free glazes.

Using locally ubiquitous materials, Fireclay partnered with their Aromas factory neighbor, Granite Rock in 1997. Difficult to repurpose excess granite dust then became a key ingredient in the recycled clay body, which was launched in 1998. Twelve years later in 2010, the introduction of Project Porcelain marked another key initiative in Fireclay's recycle waste into useful materials. Their latest innovation, the Cathode Ray Tube tile, was introduced in 2013, and released to the market in 2014. The project of converting CRT to tile expanded an already impressive recycling repertoire by inventing a way to utilize copious amounts of electronic refuse.

=== Environmental activism ===
A strong focus on keeping products and business within the US, close to the source of the materials, and crafted in an environmentally conscious, recycle-heavy manner helps Fireclay Tiles achieve LEED recognition. All Fireclay Tile products contribute LEED points to any project. Additionally, Fireclay has inaugurated a new use for sawdust, using local sawdust refuse from a furniture factory as cushioning for tile. Although traveling long distances across the country (including HI and AK), sawdust has proved itself as an efficient and green alternative to non-recyclable packing peanuts. Fireclay ships (free to customer) with 100% recycled cardboard and reused crates, and to offset the inevitable carbon emissions from shipping, Fireclay Tile maintains an active partnership with Climate Neutral.

== Products ==
All materials are found and made in the United States, with the majority being locally derived. Every tile is handmade to order in a California factory that employs vertical integration, this is the environmentally conscious process of recycling the factory's own rainwater, scraps, and homemade, lead-free glazes.

=== Ceramic tile ===
Fireclay markets two tiles, of white (Vitrail series) and red, recycled (Debris series) bodies. The Vitrail product line was launched in 1991, and includes dozens of colors today. While not made of recycled material, the clean white edges are preferable for certain projects, and the line still contributes LEED points to projects because Fireclay relies on American resources to manufacture Vitrail.

Debris product line has been in production since 1998; originally consisting of about half recycled content. However, since 2012 the Debris tile is made of 70% post-consumer recycled material. These materials induce products that were otherwise rendered useless, or eyesores, like porcelain from abandoned toilets. Due to the diversity and mixture of materials, the recycled tile body is actually more durable than most other types of tile, an unforeseen but happily embraced benefit.

=== Brick tile ===
Fireclay partnered with the oldest continually operating brick manufacturer in the United States (since 1868), McNear Brick and Block in 2012, which lead to the 2012 launch of the Glazed Thin Brick line. The collaboration has already resulted in an improved brick product; the material has progressed from being made with 30% recycled material to the 100% reclaimed earth bricks sold today. Brick is quite versatile, and can be used for interior and exterior applications and once glazed, withstands graffiti and can be wiped clean with a little elbow grease. Additionally, 1% of all brick purchases from Fireclay support charities such as the Bay Area Discovery Museum, which promotes childhood engagement with creative discovery.

=== Glass tile ===
Since the 2010 purchase of Sandhill Industries of Boise, Idaho, another glass tile company, Fireclay has manufactured and sold 100% recycled glass, consisting of locally sourced windowpanes and solar panels. In early 2014, fireclaytile.com launched the “Crush-It Custom Blend Builder” tool to visually assist clients wanting mosaics by customizing different color, pattern, and grout combinations.

==== CRT glass tile ====
A cornerstone innovation for Fireclay includes the 2013 Kickstarter project, "This Tile Used to be Your TV," in which Burns raised money to harvest old, glass monitors from Cathode Ray Tube (CRT) devices and mold them into glass. Since the invention of LCD (liquid crystal display) screens, hundreds of tons of discarded CRT units have accumulated in landfills. CRT is very hard to recycle, which is unfortunate given that nearly a billion pounds of various CRT devices exist in the USA alone, comprising nearly a third of all e-waste. Fortunately, Fireclay found a way to reinvent CRT, and now offers CRT Tile in both matte and glossy sheens, in a color called Phosphorus.

The process of creating Phosphorus CRT Tile involves working with ECS refining, an electronic recycling company that responsibly finds ways to manage problems that accompany our constantly evolving technological world. ECS separates CRT monitor pieces and cleans the part that is lead-free (the panel). The panel is the only part that Fireclay can use in order to comply with requirements set by the Department of Toxic Substance Control. From there the glass is melted down, fired, and prepared for its second life.

=== Hand painted tile ===
The original 1993 line of cuerda seca patterns and color themes are a staple in the Fireclay catalog. With more than 150 tile designs patterns to choose from, dramatic old-world tiles are typically distinguished by three motifs: warm, cool, and neutral. If the pre-set color themes are not to taste, clients can use the “Color-It!” custom blend design tool on the website to choose exactly the colors and patterns desired for cuerda seca pieces. Various tile collections have been designed for limited release, this is sometimes alongside a designer. Suzanne Redfield, founder of Kibak Tile, has collaborated with Fireclay Tile to design collections of modern hand painted tile.

== See also ==
- Heath Ceramics, a similar company offering handmade architectural tile, as well as ceramic tableware, and home accessories.
