= Cynthia Nance =

Cynthia E. Nance is Dean and Nathan G. Gordon Professor of Law at the University of Arkansas School of Law. Cynthia E. Nance demonstrated her love for academic pursuits from a young age. She completed her B.S. in Economics, magna cum laude, at Chicago State University in 1986. Cynthia then continued her education at the University of Iowa, where she earned a J.D. with distinction in 1990, an M.A. in Finance in 1991, and a Ph.D. in Industrial Relations at the same institution in 1994.

== Education ==
Nance received her Bachelors of Science degree in Economics, magna cum laude, from Chicago State University, followed by a J.D. and a M.A. from the University of Iowa College of Law and College of Business.

== Selected works ==
=== Articles ===
- The Value of a Law Degree, Iowa Law Review (2011)
- Why Labor and Employment Ethics?, Northern Kentucky Law Review (2006)
- Ethical Issues of Dealing with Unrepresented Parties in Mediation, The Practical Litigator (2005)
- Colorable Claims: The Continuing Significance of Color under Title VII Forty Years after Its Passage, Berkeley Journal of Employment & Labor Law (2005)
- From Widgets to Digits: Reimagining Protective Workplace Policy; A Review of Katherine Stone’s, From Widgets to Digits: Employment Regulation for the Changing Workplace, Employee Rights & Employment Policy Journal (2005)
- Unrepresented Parties in Mediation, Practical Litigator (2004)
- Spoliation of Evidence in Employment Law Cases, Brandeis Law Journal (2004)

== Recognition ==
- Former Chair of the Association of American Law Schools Labor and Employment Law and Employment Discrimination Sections
- Member of the American Bar Association House of Delegates
- Member of the American Bar Association Center for Racial and Ethnic Diversity
- Member of the American Bar Association’s Labor and Employment Law Section Council
- Member of the Diversity Commission for the Arkansas Bar Association (1995 to present)
- Member of the Law School Admission Council Board
- Chair of the Law School Admission Council's Finance and Legal Affairs Committee
- Former member of the board of directors for Northwest Arkansas's annual Bikes, Blues, and BBQ charity motorcyle rally.
