= Margaret L. Carney =

American ceramic historian (born 1949)

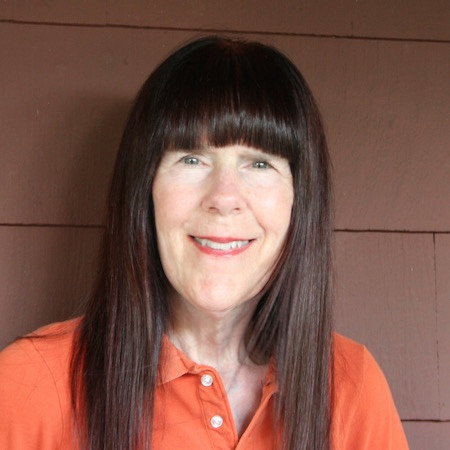
- Born: 1949 (age 76–77); Iowa City, Iowa, United States
- Education: University of Iowa (B.A., M.A.); University of Kansas (Ph.D.)
- Occupation: Ceramic historian
- Known for: Founding director and curator of the International Museum of Dinnerware Design

Margaret L. Carney (born 1949, Iowa, USA) is a ceramic historian who holds a Ph.D. in Asian art history. She is the founding director and curator of the International Museum of Dinnerware Design in Kingston, New York.

== Biography ==
Margaret L. Carney has served as director and curator of numerous museums, including the Blanden Memorial Art Museum, Fort Dodge, Iowa, 1986–1990; founding director and curator of the Alfred Ceramic Art Museum, New York State College of Ceramics at Alfred University, Alfred, New York, 1991–2002; the Blair Museum of Lithophanes, Toledo, Ohio, 2004–2012; before establishing the International Museum of Dinnerware Design in Ann Arbor, Michigan, 2012. The museum relocated to Kingston, New York, 2024.

She has authored more than 100 books, catalogues, journal articles, and essays; curated more than 100 exhibitions, presented numerous lectures worldwide, and juried a dozen exhibitions. The overarching scope of these various professional activities is the subject of ceramics.

Born in Iowa City, Iowa, Carney received a B.A. in anthropology/archaeology from the University of Iowa in 1971 and an M.A in Asian art history from the University of Iowa in 1981. She received a Master of Philosophy degree from the University of Kansas, Lawrence, Kansas, in 1986, and a Ph.D. in Asian art history, with a focus on Chinese ceramics and museum studies, also from the University of Kansas, Lawrence, Kansas, in 1989. She has the honor of being the last student chosen to study with Laurence Sickman, director emeritus of the Nelson-Atkins Museum of Art in Kansas City, Missouri.

Interwoven with her academic training and passion for ceramics, is her devotion to a museum career for herself as a director and curator, and for sharing collections. This museum journey began with her first museum position in 1973 at Herbert Hoover Presidential Library and Museum, where she fell in love with the Hoover's Chinese ceramics collection and thus began her art history and studio pottery studies while she worked in the curator's office.

Her research and studies took her to Taiwan as well as China in the 1980s, where she studied in the Archaeology Department at Zhengzhou University Zhengzhou, Henan Provence, China and worked with the leading Chinese authority in museum studies.

Her doctoral dissertation about the ceramics recovered from the buried marketplace of Julu, Hebei Province, China, was translated into Chinese in 2018, and she was invited back to Julu to become the Advisor on the Ancient City of Julu, which is an ongoing project.

== Academic appointments ==
- New York State College of Ceramics at Alfred University, Alfred, NY, 1991–2002
- The Ohio State University, Columbus, OH, visiting art historian, 2002–2006

== Awards and honors ==
- Kress Foundation Grant (1982)
- Bei Shan Tang Foundation Grant, Hong Kong (1984–1985)
- Fulbright-Hays Research Grant, Alternate (1986–1987)
- American Ceramic Circle Research Grant (1991–1992)
- Elected Member, International Academy of Ceramics (1992)
- Senior Fellow, Smithsonian Institution National Museum of American Art and the Renwick Gallery (1993, 1994, 1999)
- State University of New York Chancellor's Award for Excellence in Professional Service (1999)
- Tile Heritage Foundation, Doty Research Grant (1998–1999, 2002–2003)
- Fellow, American Ceramic Society (2002)

== Selected publications ==
- Chu-lu: A Northern Sung Ceramic Legacy. Doctoral dissertation University of Kansas, Lawrence, Kansas, 1989.
- Henan Marbled Ware, Oriental Art Magazine, London, Winter 1989.
- Charles Fergus Binns, Father of American Studio Ceramics, Hudson Hills Press, New York, 1998.
- Lost Molds and Found Dinnerware: Rediscovering Eva Zeisel's Hallcraft, Schein-Joseph International Museum of Ceramic Art, Alfred, NY, 1999.
- Glidden Pottery, Schein-Joseph International Museum of Ceramic Art, Alfred, NY, 2001.
- Flint Faience Tiles, Schiffer Publications, Atglen, PA, 2004.
- Lithophanes, Schiffer Publications, Atglen, PA, 2008.
