= Heath Ceramics =

American ceramics company

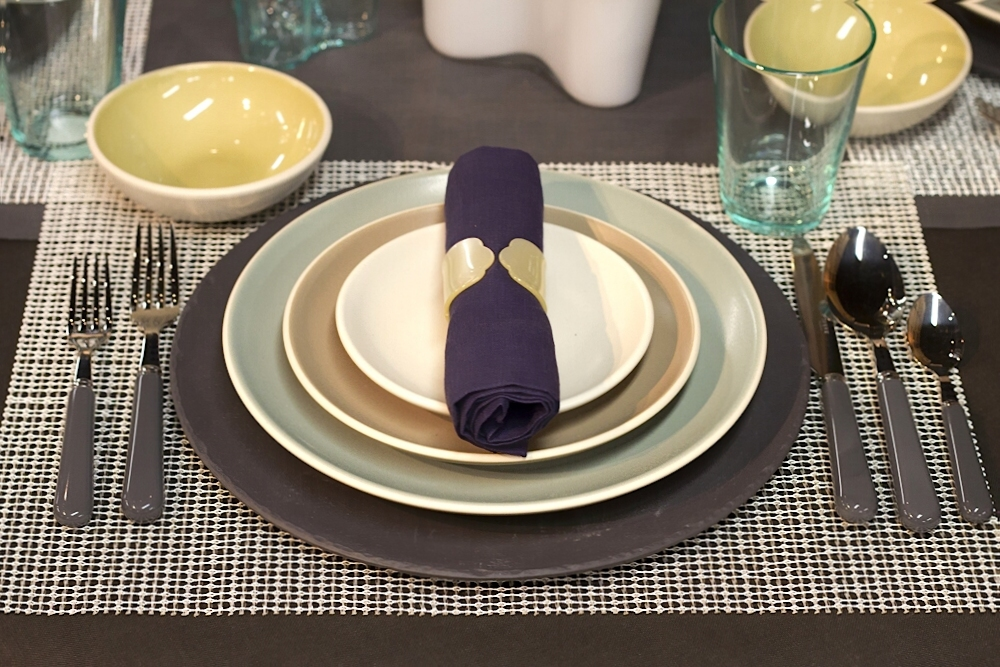
Place setting with Heath products

Heath Ceramics is a B Corp certified American company that designs, manufactures, and retails goods for tabletop and home, and is best known for handcrafted ceramic tableware and architectural tile in distinctive glazes.

Founded in Sausalito, California, by Edith Heath (1911–2005) and her husband Brian Heath (1911–2001) in 1948, Heath Ceramics is now owned and run by Catherine Bailey and Robin Petravic, who purchased the company in 2003.

Heath has two manufacturing facilities: its original dinnerware factory in Sausalito (built in 1959), and a tile factory (established in 2012) in the Heath Building in San Francisco.

Heath sells directly through its stores and its own website, having discontinued its wholesale business in early 2015. Heath maintains four physical sales outlets. In addition to its dinnerware factory and showroom in Sausalito, Heath has a showroom and clay studio in Los Angeles (opened in 2008); a showroom within the San Francisco Ferry Building (opened in 2010); and their flagship San Francisco showroom and clay studio, co-located with the tile factory in the Heath Building (opened in 2012).

Heath has won numerous awards for design, and in 2015 received the National Design Award for Institutional Achievement, awarded by the Cooper Hewitt, Smithsonian Design Museum, in recognition of Heath's commitment to business by design.

== Founding and early years ==
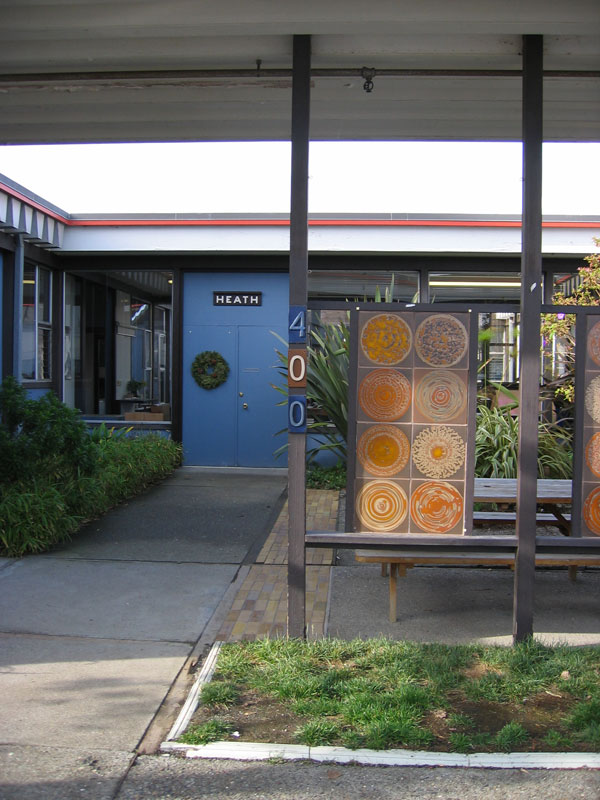
Factory in Sausalito

After Edith Heath exhibited her work at her first solo show at the Palace of Fine Arts in San Francisco in 1944, a buyer from San Francisco retailer Gump's approached her to supply their store with her hand-thrown pottery using the company's pottery studio in San Francisco, and she accepted the opportunity.

In 1947, Edith began to design and execute a limited hand-thrown production of her pottery and tableware with four apprentices in her own studio. Other retailers, such as Neiman Marcus, Marshall Field's, Bullocks, and the City of Paris began to order her tableware, and in 1948 she opened Heath Ceramics in Sausalito. Edith designed the pieces and formulated the clays and glazes. Notably, she formulated the clay base for a single kiln-firing at a lower-than-normal temperature, one closer to that associated with earthenware bodies rather than stoneware. This reduced energy usage while producing a durable product.

In addition to running the business side of Heath, husband Brian Heath also oversaw engineering (inventing numerous pieces of equipment) and managed the business. By 1949, Heath Ceramics was producing 100,000 pieces a year.

As the volume of orders increased, Edith designed a Sausalito factory space with the architecture firm Marquis & Stoller, which was completed in 1959.

Over the following years, Heath Ceramics continued to sell its ceramics directly and through retailers, and also began to supply restaurants with dinnerware. Its original 1947 line, Coupe, was followed in the early 1970s by Rim, which found broad success with restaurant proprietors. In 1992, Heath released the Plaza Line.

Heath also began to develop architectural tile in the late 1950s, and in 1971, Edith won the American Institute of Architects Gold Medal for her custom tiles designed and created for the Pasadena Art Museum, today known as the Norton Simon Museum.

With recessions, changes in taste, inexpensive imports, and the aging of Brian and Edith Heath, the company struggled in the 1990s. The Heaths left daily operations of the company to employees in 1993. Edith eventually turned to a long-time family friend, Jay Stewart, to help establish the Brian & Edith Heath Trust to help create the legal mechanism for making decisions about the future of the business. Brian died in 2001, and Edith in 2005.

== Operations, from 2003 to present ==
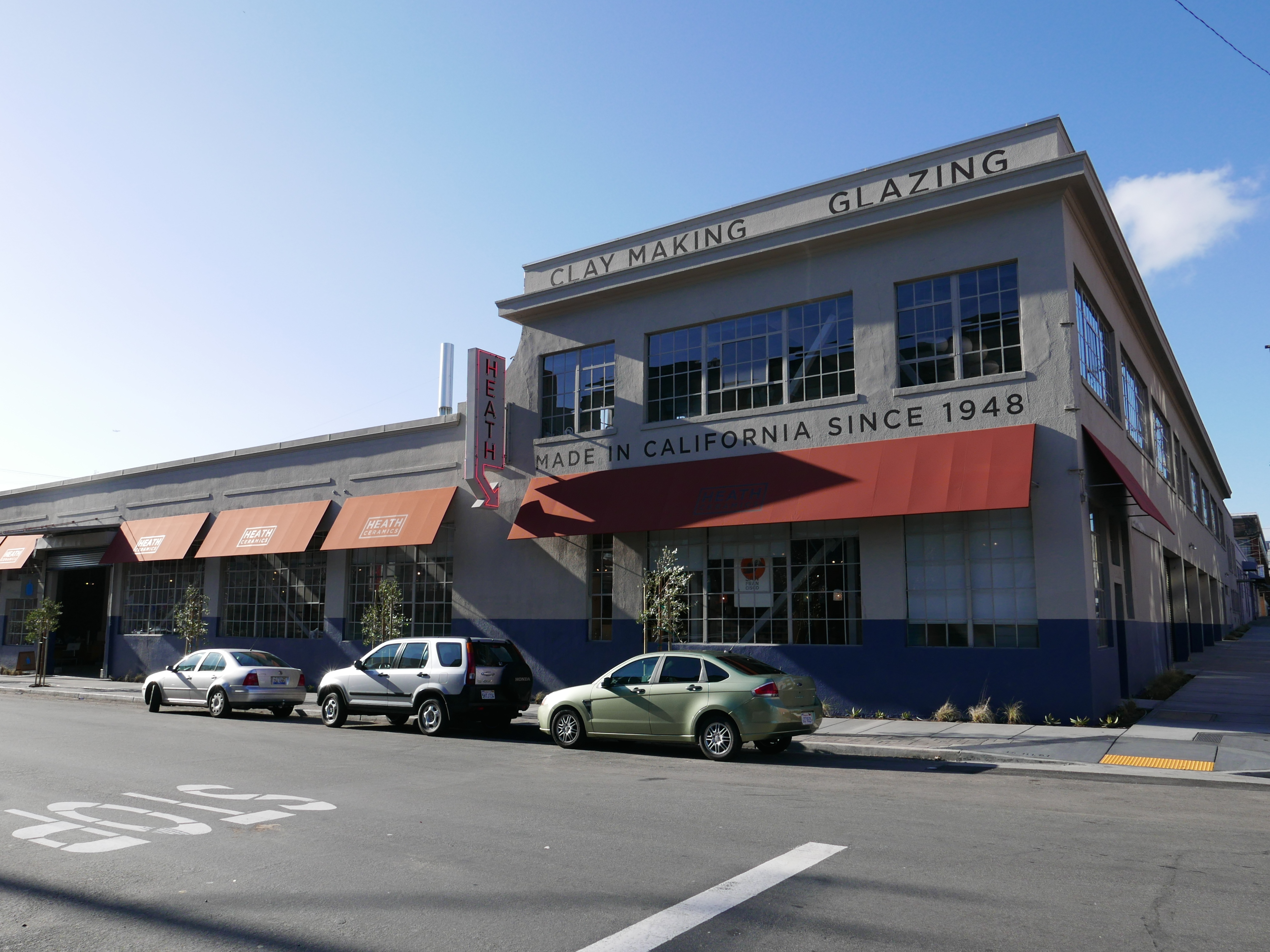
Factory and store in San Francisco

In 2003, designers Robin Petravic, a product design engineer, and Catherine Bailey, an industrial designer, purchased Heath Ceramics from the Brian & Edith Heath Trust.

While the company was struggling financially at that time, with just 24 employees and approximately $1 million in revenues, the couple were attracted by the opportunity to bring back designing and making under one roof, enabling a stronger connection between the start of a design process and the result. While respecting Edith and Brian Heath's aesthetics and ethos, the couple set about streamlining operations and product lines; created new products; and began selling products from independent makers.

Under Bailey and Petravic's ownership, the company also began to expand its collaborations with artists and designers with shared design kinship and manufacturing values. A notable collaboration was with Alice Waters, founder and chef of Chez Panisse in Berkeley, California. The restaurant uses Heath dinnerware in the restaurant, called the Chez Panisse collection, and was the result of a collaboration with Christina Kim and Alice Waters in 2006.

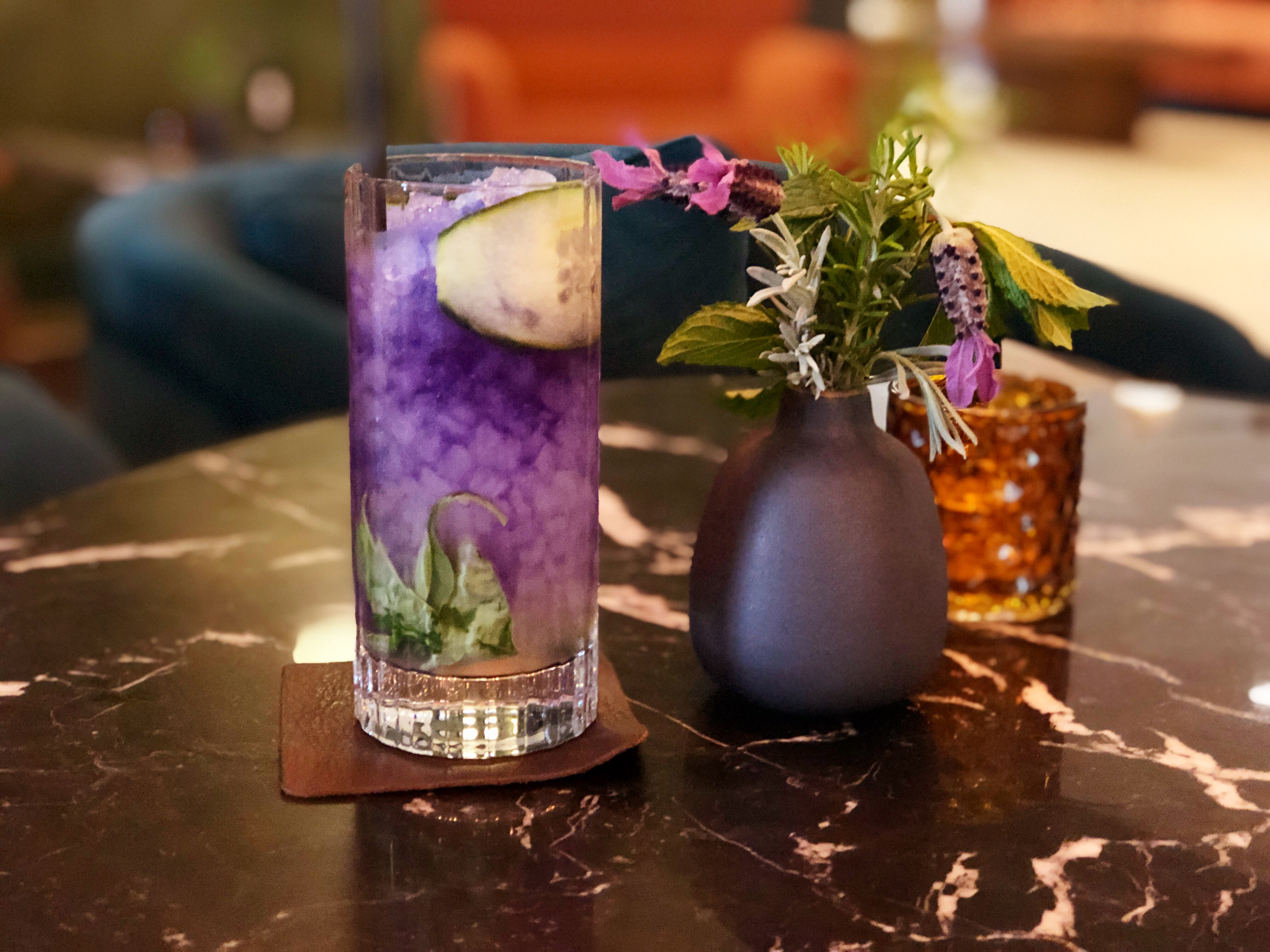
A black Heath Ceramics flower vase

In 2008, Heath opened its Los Angeles showroom and studio, its first location outside of the Bay Area. The studio was opened with artist potter Adam Silverman, who served as studio director until 2015.

Subsequent collaborations have included those with Natalie Chanin of Alabama Chanin (resulting in a line of hand-etched dinnerware at Heath, evoking the hand-stitching of Alabama Chanin linens), and designers House Industries (resulting in a line of ceramic house numbers featuring typefaces by Richard Neutra and Charles Eames, and a line of clocks featuring House Industries typeface). Heath has also collaborated with Geoff McFetridge, and Commune Design to create lines of limited edition pieces. In 2013, Heath also invited a number of artists to collaborate on a line of one-of-a-kind clocks.

In 2010, Heath opened a showroom within the San Francisco Ferry Building Marketplace. Then, recognizing the need for dedicated tile manufacturing, Heath Ceramics opened its tile factory and flagship San Francisco showroom and clay studio in 2012.

At the beginning of 2014, Heath exited the wholesale business, going direct to consumers via its showrooms and through its website.

In late 2015, Bailey and Petravic authored a book on designing with tile, called Tile Makes the Room, a book exploring design through tile.

In 2016, Heath began to move beyond its traditional focus on tableware and tile, designing a line of wallpaper, and introducing a line of soft goods.

== Awards ==
- 2022 AIGA Corporate Leadership Award
- 2015 Award for Corporate and Institutional Achievement, National Design Awards, Cooper Hewitt Museum
- 2014 SFMade, Founders Award
- 2014 Made in USA Foundation Hall of Fame
- 2011 Finalist, Product Design, National Design Awards, Cooper Hewitt Museum
- 2009 Finalist, Corporate and Institutional Achievement, National Design Awards, Cooper Hewitt Museum
- 2008 Presidential Commendation, American Institute of Architects San Francisco

== See also ==
- California pottery
- Fireclay Tile, a similar architectural tile manufacturing company located in Aromas, California
- National Tile Contractors Association
