= Paul Secon =

American journalist

- Born: July 13, 1916; Philadelphia, Pennsylvania, U.S.
- Died: February 24, 2007 (aged 90)
- Occupation: Businessman
- Known for: Co-founder of Pottery Barn
- Spouses: Fairfax Kirby; Berta Moltke
- Children: 2, including Lucas Secon

Paul Secon (July 13, 1916 – February 24, 2007) was an American entrepreneur and songwriter, who co-founded Pottery Barn with his brother, Morris, in 1950.

== Biography ==
Secon was born to a Jewish family in Philadelphia, the son of immigrants from Russia. He was musically gifted, and played the trumpet, piano, oboe and flute. Secon was the music critic for The Boston Evening Transcript. In 1950, he was a music editor for Billboard and Variety and a songwriter having written for Nat King Cole and The Mills Brothers (among many others) whilst living in New York City when he heard about a business opportunity from Morris. Morris' wife had recently purchased stoneware at a yard sale in their hometown of Rochester, New York. Morris took a liking to the pieces, which were designed by Glidden Parker at his factory in Alfred, New York. Parker informed him that he had three barns full of discontinued or slightly damaged products for sale. The brothers decided to buy the pieces for US$2,500, and, with the help of their father, rented a store on 10th Avenue in New York City to sell their wares, thus giving birth to Pottery Barn.

A year later, an article in The New Yorker praised the store, and customers flocked to it in droves. Secon remained store manager, while Morris, who was also musically inclined, became principal hornist for the Rochester Philharmonic Orchestra and teacher at the Eastman School of Music. In 1959, Secon started taking long trips to Europe in search of new products, and asked Morris to help manage the store. In 1966, Secon sold the company to Morris and moved to Denmark, where he pursued his earlier career of music and writing, and where his son, Lucas Secon (best known for his 1994 hit song "Lucas with the Lid Off") was born. In 1980, Secon moved back to the United States and settled in Manhattan before relocating to Rochester in 1997, where he died at his home at the age of 90.

== Personal life ==
His second wife was Danish artist Berta Moltke; they had one son.

== Sources ==
- Hevesi, Dennis (March 7, 2007). "Paul Secon, Entrepreneur Who Helped Found Pottery Barn, Dies at 91". The New York Times. Retrieved on March 8, 2007.
- Miller, Stephen (March 6, 2007). "Paul Secon, 91, Founded Pottery Barn". The New York Sun. Retrieved on March 8, 2007.
- Diaz, Fernando (March 3, 2007). "Pottery Barn's co-founder dies at 91". Democrat and Chronicle. Retrieved on March 8, 2007.
