= Don Schreckengost =

American industrial ceramic designer

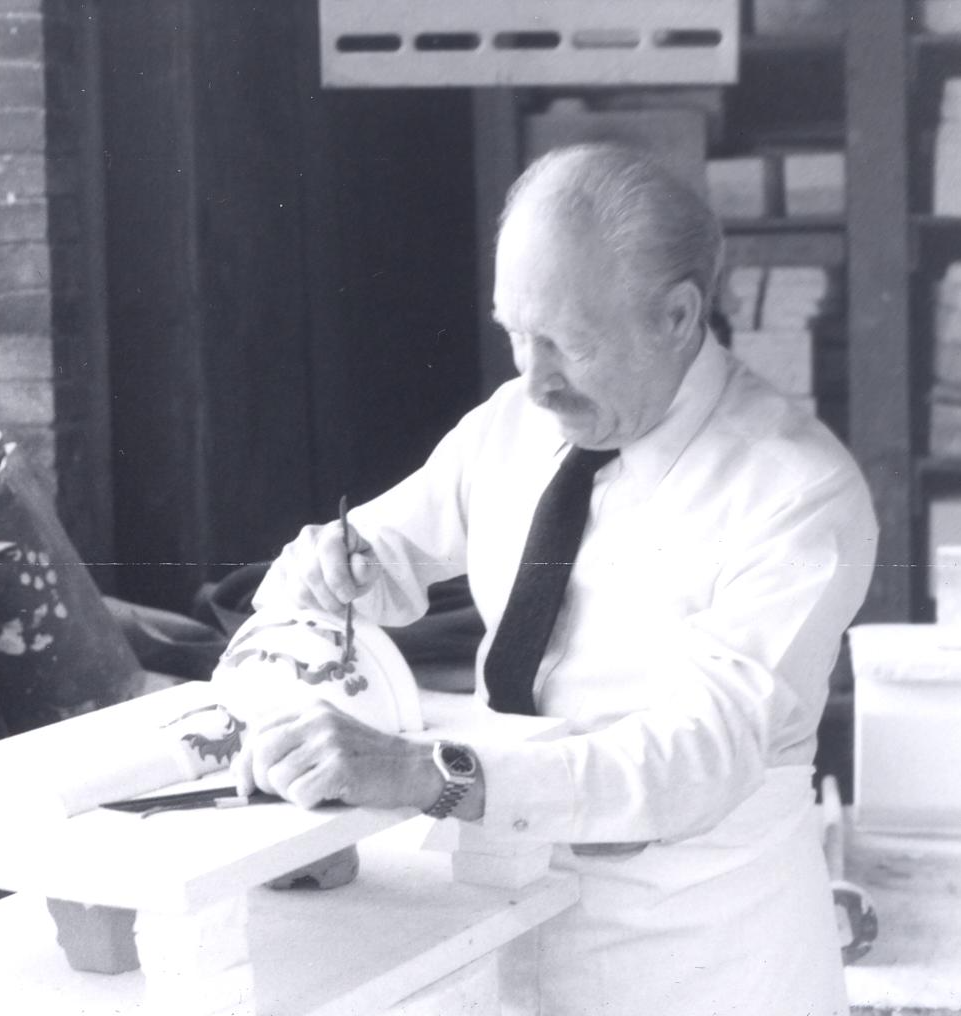
Don Schreckengost at Hall China in 1984

Don Schreckengost (September 23, 1910 – December 24, 2001) was an American industrial ceramic designer who was active from the 1930s through the 1990s. He is considered to be the first American industrial ceramic designer.

== Early life ==
Schreckengost was born in Sebring, Ohio. He was one of six children and the youngest of three brothers. At the time, Sebring was an important center in the US ceramics industry. His father was in charge of the kilns at a ceramics company and as a child Don would go to the factory with his father on Saturdays and work in clay while his father prepared for the upcoming week. His oldest brother Viktor Schreckengost became an important industrial designer who taught at Cleveland Institute of Art. His other brother Paul Schreckengost became a model and mold maker who also worked in the ceramic industry. Don worked with Paul at the Gem Clay Forming Company while he was in high school and learned the art of ceramic model and mold making. He graduated from the Cleveland School for the Arts (now Cleveland Institute of Art) in 1935. During his time in school he spent his summers working for ceramics companies, and completed an internship at Salem China in Salem, Ohio.

In addition to his interest in art and ceramics, Schreckengost had a passion for music and sports from an early age. He was in a big band based in Chicago for a short time in 1935, and played semi-pro baseball and basketball in Ohio and New York.

== Professional career ==
While working as an intern at Salem China while he was a student, Schreckengost designed Tricorne, a dinnerware line with a unique triangular shape. The design was inspired in part by the development of a bright orange glaze at Salem China.

In 1935, Schreckengost became professor and chair of the design department at the New York State College of Ceramics at Alfred University. He was recruited to establish a curriculum in industrial ceramic design. His students included Glidden Parker who established Glidden Pottery, in Alfred, New York. In 1936, he studied sculpture under Adolph Jensen in Stockholm, and in 1939 he was guest instructor at the Universitaria de Bellas Arts in San Miguel Allende, Mexico where he created a large fresco depicting ceramics. During his time at Alfred, he was active as a designer, working with Syracuse China, Buffalo China, Salem China and Du Bois Press in Rochester, NY.

In 1945, Schreckengost left Alfred University, and became Design Director at Homer Laughlin China Company, in Newell, WV, which was the largest pottery in the world at the time. While at Homer Laughlin his designs included the Epicure, Skytone, and Rhythm lines. In 1960 he established Don Schreckengost Design for Industry, Inc. Through this business he divided his time between a number of different companies including The Hall China Company, Salem China, Royal China, Mayer China, the O. Hommel Company, and Summitville Tiles.

=== Awards and honors ===
Awards and honors received by Schreckengost include:

U.S. Pottery Award, Contemporary Ceramics of the Western Hemisphere, Syracuse Museum of Fine Arts, 1941

The Binns Medal, 1946

Fellow, American Ceramic Society, 1950

=== Collections ===
Schreckengost's work is held in the following collections:

The Smithsonian Institution, Washington, DC

Cooper-Hewett National Design Museum, New York, NY

Everson Museum, Syracuse, NY

Museum of Ceramics, East Liverpool, OH

International Museum of Dinnerware Design, Ann Arbor, MI

=== Murals ===
Schreckengost painted the following murals:

Fresco – Mural – Eschel De Bellas Artes, San Miguel, Mexico, 1939

Exterior Mural (107' x 17') Former Summitville Tile Showroom at 631 Boardman-Canfield Road, Youngstown, OH

Interior Topological Tile Mural (40' x 19'), Subway, Philadelphia Transit Authority
