= National Tile Contractors Association =

The National Tile Contractors Association (NTCA) is a nonprofit trade association dedicated to the professional installation of ceramic tile and natural stone, established in 1947. The NTCA aims to improve the industry through education and training, participation in the development of standards and methods. The current president of the association is Martin Howard .

In February 2016 Bart Bettiga, executive director of the NTCA, officially announced that the association has joined forces with the Contractors Association of America (CCA) Global Partners to bring education and technical expertise to its members.

== NTCA University ==
The NTCA University is an online training and learning system developed to create awareness of industry standards, improve product knowledge, and train tile installers. Programs available and in development include contractor apprenticeship, and continuing education (CEU's) that unite sales and product training and business education.

== Certification Program ==
The Certified Tile Installer Evaluation is a certification program introduced by the NTCA in alliance with the Ceramic Tile Education Foundation (CTEF) and the Tile Council of North America (TCNA). The program was developed in response to the lack of a mechanism for consumers to know the level of proficiency of prospective installers. The evaluation itself is a validation of the skills and knowledge of tile installers which includes a multiple-choice exam and a hands-on test. Both are based on current industry standards and best practices for producing professional installations that exhibit good workmanship. Since its inception in 2008 and until 2014, the CTI Evaluation has certified over 1000 tile installers, aiming to reach 1500 by the end of 2014.

== Board of directors ==
The NTCA Board of Directors is elected by members at their annual meeting. It is composed of the Executive officers of the Association, representatives of 12 regions, and members from distribution and tile and installation material manufacturers. Terms for the Board of Directors are for two years.

Name	Position
Martin Howard	Chairman of Board
Christopher Walker	President
Martin Brookes	First Vice President
Sam Bruce	Second Vice President
Bart A. Bettiga	Executive Director / Treasurer
Jim Olson	Assistant Executive Director
Nyle Wadford	Board Advisor
John Cox	Board Advisor
Danielle Hunsicker	Distributor Representative
Real Bourdage	Manufacturing Representative
Greg Schad	Allied Manufacturing Representative
Chris Dalene	Region 1 Regional Director
Buck Collins	Region 2 Regional Director
Rod Owen	Region 3 Regional Director
Gregory Michael	Region 4 Regional Director
Kevin Insalato	Region 5 Regional Director
Brad Denny	Region 6 Regional Director

== Committees ==
Committee	Main Focus	Chairperson
Methods and Standards	Assess industry standards and methods and make suggested revisions and edits from a contractor perspective.	Kevin Fox
Finance	Financial management of the association for short and long term growth.	Bart Bettiga
Business Development	Business Reference Manual creation and revision, and to identify new initiatives to assist NTCA members in business management.	John Cox
Training and Education	Develops training initiatives and provides staff direction for content, style and presentation.	Jan Hohn
Membership	Works closely with staff to formal membership recruitment and retention strategies to grow the association.	Martin Brookes
Convention Planning	Develops association conference programs and activities at national trade shows and conventions.	Bart Bettiga

== See also ==
- Medieval letter tile
