= Edith Heath =

American studio potter (1911-2005)

- Born: Edith Kiertzner; May 24, 1911; Ida Grove, Iowa
- Died: December 27, 2005 (aged 94); Tiburon, California
- Education: Chicago Teachers College; San Francisco Art Institute
- Known for: Ceramic art
- Movement: Bauhaus

Edith Kiertzner Heath (May 24, 1911 – December 27, 2005) was an American studio potter and founder of Heath Ceramics. The company, well known for its mid-century modern ceramic tableware, including "Heathware," and architectural tiles, is still operating in Sausalito, California, after being founded in 1948.

== Life and education ==
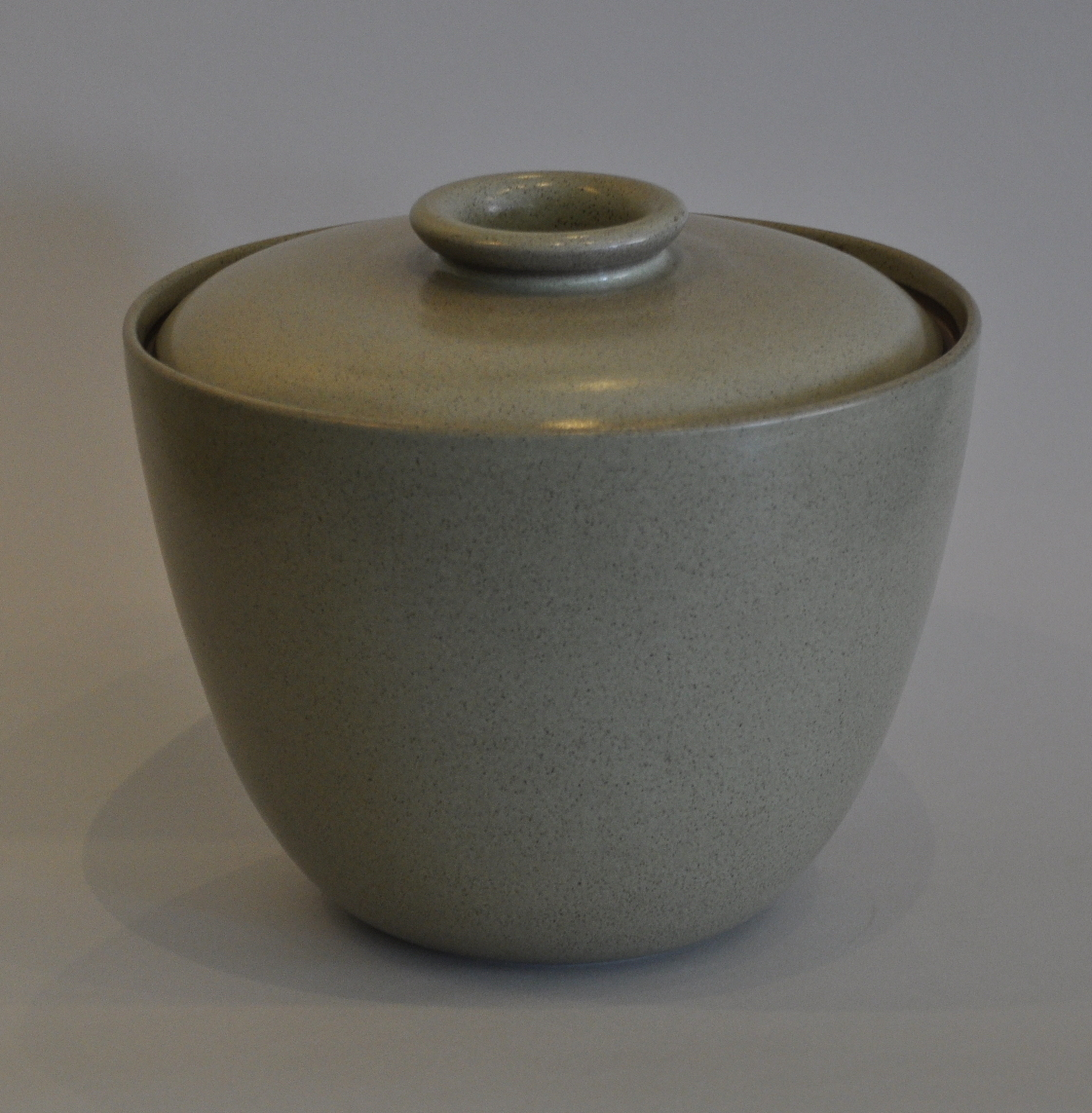
Edith Heath ceramic canister.

Kiertzner was born on May 24, 1911, in Ida Grove, Iowa forty miles east of Sioux City, Iowa. Edith was the second born in a family with a total of seven children. Her parents were Danish immigrants Niels and Karoline Kiertzner who raised their children in a rural farm setting.

In 1931, after she had graduated High School Kiertzner enrolled at the Chicago Normal School, later renamed Chicago Teachers College where she studied art education and graduated in 1934. Her practice as an educator was heavily influenced by John Dewey. She enrolled part-time at the Art Institute of Chicago after graduation taking her first ceramic course.

In 1938 Edith was invited to work at a Federal Art Project training school in Batavia, Illinois. While there she learned from László Moholy-Nagy and met Brian Heath whom she married three months after their encounter.

At the start of their marriage the couple moved to San Francisco when Brian began to work for the American Red Cross. While living in San Francisco Edith pursued her passion for ceramics in the couples' apartment with the aid of her husband who converted an old treadle-sewing machine into pottery wheel for his wife.

== Developing ceramics ==
Relocating to San Francisco Edith contributed in establishing California as a hub for the mid-century modern movement. While in San Francisco Edith accepted a position as an art teacher at the Presidio Hill School and audited classes at the California School of Fine Arts. She developed a clay body in these classes which she adapted many times for her production work.

In 1943, she studied eutectics, the science of mixing various metals with clay to create specific properties, with Willard Kahn through the University of California Extension courses. She experimented with mixing various metals into the clay mixture to achieve different properties. She collected various West Coast clay bodies herself and experimented with them before settling on clay from the Sierra mountains because of its ability to withstand very high heat. Heath's continued experimentation led to her becoming an expert in how different clay types affected aesthetic qualities of her wares. She also developed custom glazes, including the speckle glaze that was innovative at the time.

In 1944, her first major show was at the California Palace of the Legion of Honor. And in 1945, Edith stopped teaching and Brian become her acting manager.

== Heath ceramics ==
Edith Heath and her husband Brian founded Heath Ceramics after World War II with founding partners, Charles Eames, Ray Eames, Eva Ziesel, Marguerite Wildenhain, Rüssel Wright, and Mary Wright in Sausalito, California. A buyer from San Francisco retailer Gumps approached Edith to supply their store with her high quality hand-thrown pottery using the company's pottery studio. She accepted the opportunity, while continuing to work in her own studio. Major retailers began to order tableware, which required Heath to develop ways to manufacture her pieces from her design rather than create them by hand. In 1948, she opened Heath Ceramics in Sausalito, California. By 1949, Heath was producing 100,000 pieces a year.

Heath Ceramics was purchased by Robin Petravic and Catherine Bailey in 2003. Edith Heath died on December 27, 2005, at her home in Tiburon, California.

=== Tableware ===
Edith Heath is known for making domestic items. In 1949 Health released her first official tableware collection Coupe a line which remains in demand and has been in constant production. Originally the collection was offered in colors such as sand, sage, blue, aqua, and apricot however there has been periodic changes to the texture and color of the glazes. Other Heath pottery lines include "Rim," designed in 1960, and "Plaza," designed in the 1980s. "Rim", as its name implies, had an unglazed outer rim. It was favored by restaurants because the rim made the pieces easy to carry and the pieces stacked securely.

=== Architectural tile ===
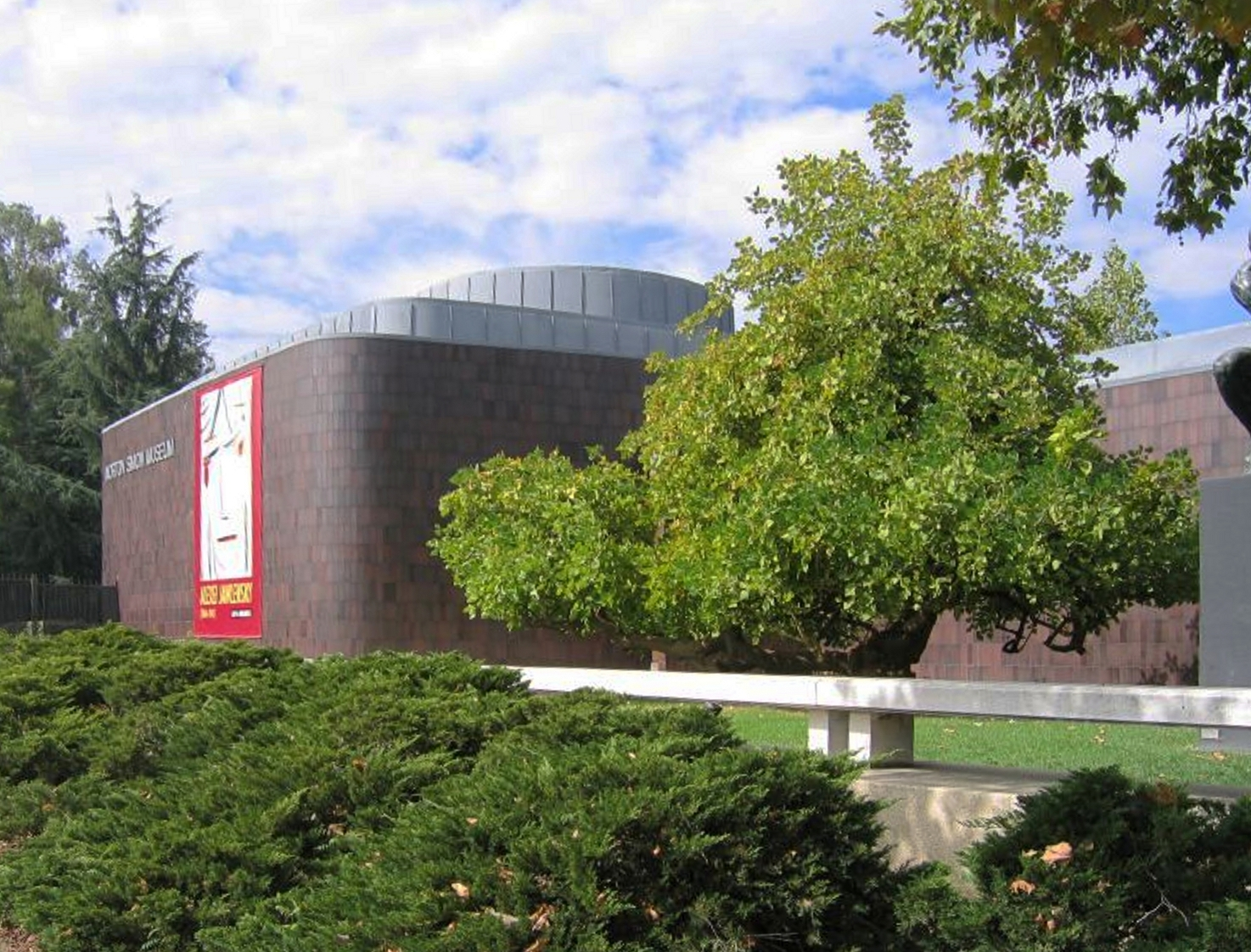
Exterior of Norton Simon Museum highlighting Heath's tile used on the building.

Later in her career she grew her practice into tiles and building materials as developed the idea of fire-resistant products. This idea came to her after a fire took place in 1991 in Oakland, California which destroyed many homes and killed 25 people.

The Pasadena Art Museum, now the Norton Simon Museum, in Pasadena, California, and designed by Pasadena architects Thornton Ladd and John Kelsey of the firm 'Ladd + Kelsey' used Heath architectural tiles. The distinctive and modern curvilinear exterior facade is faced in 115,000 glazed tiles, in varying brown tones with an undulating surface, made by Edith Heath. They are part of the backdrop many see when viewing the New Year's Rose Parade. Heath was awarded the American Institute of Architects Industrial Arts Medal for this work. It was the first time the medal had been given to a non-architect. She also collaborated with architects Eero Saarinen, Alexander Girard, Kevin Roche, and William Pereira.

=== Other ===
Interested in making use of small clay leftovers and space in the kiln, Heath created a line of ceramic buttons. Although colorful, the buttons did not work well and they were discontinued.

Heath Ceramics ashtrays became one of their most popular items and at one point it made up 25% of the company's business. The ashtrays had a V-shaped notch that perfectly held the cigarette in place and allowed the cigarette to self-extinguish. This idea has been accredited to Brian its key design quality allowed the ashtray to grow in popularity. It was once dubbed by the city of Seattle, Washington as Safety Ashtrays was required to be installed in every public building in the city.

== Exhibits and media ==
- In 2019 the public television station KCET produced a biographical documentary about Edith Heath's life and work, entitled Heath Ceramics: The Making of a California Classic. The film was directed by Chris Metzler and Quinn Costello, and explored the history and influence of Edith Heath, including her continuing legacy at Heath Ceramics today. The film was honored by the LA Press Club at the 2019 National Arts and Entertainment Awards where the film won first-place recognition in the Documentary or Special Program Feature (over 30 minutes) category.
- Edith Heath: Tabletop Modernist, Pasadena Museum of California Art, May 31-September 20, 2009
- Edith Heath: A Life in Clay, Oakland Museum of California, January 29, 2022 – October 30, 2022. Co-curated by the OMCA and Heath expert Jennifer Volland.
- In 1948 the MoMA permanently added two of Heath Ceramics bowls to their collection

== Push Backs ==
- Edith was asked to leave the San Francisco Potters' Association because she believe that mechanically produced pieces created from a manual prototype was just as authentic as the original. Similarly, she was criticized for committing to the Bauhaus principle which integrated art and technology.

== Awards ==
- AIA Industrial Arts Medal award from the American Institute of Architects, 1971
