= Chicago State University =

Public university in Chicago, Illinois, US

- Former names: Cook County Normal School (1867–1896); Chicago Normal School (1896–1938); Chicago Teachers College (1938–1965); Chicago State College (1965–1971)
- Motto: Responsibility
- Type: Public university
- Established: September 2, 1867; 159 years ago
- Accreditation: HLC
- Academic affiliations: TMCF; Space-grant
- Endowment: $10 million (FY2024)
- Budget: $119 million (FY2025)
- President: Zaldwaynaka Scott
- Provost: Sonja Feist-Price
- Faculty: 152 (fall 2025)
- Administrative staff: 282 (fall 2025)
- Students: 2,505 (fall 2025)
- Undergraduates: 1,747 (fall 2025)
- Postgraduates: 758 (fall 2025)
- Location: Chicago, Illinois, U.S. 41.718°N 87.609°W
- Campus: 161 acres (65 ha); Large city
- Colors: Green (primary), blue, and light green
- Nickname: Cougars
- Sporting affiliations: NCAA Division I FCS – Northeast Conference
- Mascot: Southside T. Cougar
- Website: www.csu.edu
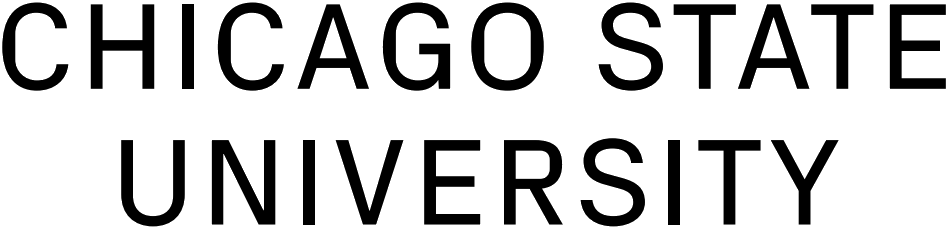

Chicago State University (CSU) is a public university in Chicago, Illinois, United States. Founded in 1867 by the Cook County Board of Commissioners, it was established as the first teacher training school in Cook County. In 1960, the institution was divided into two branches with one eventually becoming Northeastern Illinois University. The state of Illinois began funding the institution in 1951 and assumed full control in 1965. CSU is a predominantly black (PBI) institution.

== History ==
=== Early history: 19th century ===
Cook County Normal School was founded in 1867 as Cook County’s first teacher training school largely through the initiative of John F. Eberhart, the Commissioner of Schools for Cook County. Eberhart noted that Cook County schools lagged far behind their counterparts in the City of Chicago, especially in terms of the quality and competence of instructors. He convinced the County Commissioners to hold a teacher training institute in April 1860; its success convinced the commissioners of the need for a permanent school to educate teachers. In September 1867, the Cook County Board of Commissioners created a Normal school at Blue Island on a two-year experimental basis; Daniel Sanborn Wentworth was appointed as the first principal.

The school opened as a permanent institution in Englewood, which at that time was a village beyond the city-limits of Chicago at that time. After Wentworth died in 1883, he was replaced by Colonel Francis Wayland Parker, a towering figure in the history of American education. Parker was an educational innovator who helped construct the philosophy of progressive education, which has decisively shaped American schooling over the past century. Dedicated to the proposition that the nature and interests of the child should determine curricular decisions, not vice versa, progressive reformers from the 1890s forward tried to banish what they saw as oppressive and authoritarian standards of instruction. Parker urged teachers to grant pupils the freedom to learn from their environment, to let curiosity rather than rewards or punishments provide their motivation, and to advance American democracy by democratizing their classrooms. John Dewey wrote in The New Republic in 1930 that Parker, "more nearly than any other one person, was the father of the progressive educational movement." Parker believed that education was the cornerstone of a democracy, and that to achieve this end rote memorization should be replaced with exploration of the environment. Parker's Talks on Pedagogics preceded Dewey's own School and Society by five years, and it is one of the foundational texts in the progressive movement.

By the 1890s, Cook County was unable to provide the requisite support for its Normal School. Since many graduates found employment in the Chicago Public Schools system, it was natural that the city would take over, though initially it was very resistant to the idea. In 1897, the Chicago Board of Education assumed responsibility for what was now the Chicago Normal School. Shortly thereafter, Francis W. Parker, the school's renowned principal, resigned after the Board failed to implement the recommendations of a school system commission headed by William Rainey Harper of the University of Chicago. Harper suggested raising the standards for admission to the Normal School, increasing the total number of teachers trained, and strengthening oversight of graduates once they were working in the public schools.

Parker was replaced by Arnold Tompkins. Tompkins was an Hegelian who introduced key reforms that helped mold the institution's philosophy. Tompkins declared his dissatisfaction with the practice school then used as a laboratory for student-teachers. He wanted instructors to gain real world experience in Chicago's public schools, and he encouraged their placement in poor, immigrant communities. From that point forward, the school would be characterized not just by its innovative pedagogical practices, but also by its commitment to expanding opportunity to underserved sectors of society.

=== Early 20th century ===
Tompkins was succeeded as president by Ella Flagg Young, a pioneering educator in her own right. Young received a PhD under John Dewey at the University of Chicago, and after leaving Chicago Normal School served as Superintendent of the Chicago Public Schools system. She attempted to expand the curriculum to three years, but was stymied by the Board of Education. After Young left to become Superintendent in 1909, William Bishop Owen became Principal of CNS.

In 1896, the school was renamed Chicago Normal School, with higher admissions standards and several new buildings gradually added to the campus. The school moved to a three-year curriculum, with heavier emphasis placed on traditional academic subjects as opposed to pedagogy. The school was an increasingly attractive educational avenue for Chicago's immigrant communities, who could get inexpensive preliminary schooling before transferring to a university. During the Great Depression severe budget shortages forced the college to curtail its operations, and almost eventuated in its closing. In 1932, the Board of Education budget shrank by $12 million. To many, an obvious strategy for economizing was to close the Normal College, since there were no positions in the school system for trained teachers anyway.

The faculty and students campaigned vigorously to keep the college open. Pep rallies, publications, and the efforts of immigrant communities were all part of the mobilization in favor of continued operations. As the economy stabilized, the threat to dissolve the college receded, though it did not disappear. Meanwhile, interest in the school rose, as financial destitution forced many Chicago-area students to forgo residential institutions elsewhere for a commuter campus closer to home.

In 1938, the school again changed its name, this time to Chicago Teacher’s College to reflect the recent adoption of a four-year curriculum. President John A. Bartky had ambitious plans for invigorating instruction through a new commitment to the liberal arts and a doubling of the time devoted to practice teaching. In addition, a Master of Education degree was offered for the first time. However, Bartky's reforms were interrupted by the outbreak of World War II, which depleted the faculty and student body alike. Bartky himself enlisted in the Navy in 1942, and never returned to the college. In his absence, the Chicago Board of Education reversed most of his curricular innovations.

After the war ended, Raymond Mack Cook was hired as Dean. Cook's primary achievement was to convince the state of Illinois to take over funding of the college. The city was no longer able to fund the institution adequately, and in 1951 Governor Adlai Stevenson signed legislation that reimbursed the Board of Education for its operating expenses on a permanent basis. In 1965, Cook succeeded in convincing the state take responsibility for the college entirely.

=== 1950–1979: Name changes, new location ===
As the demographic composition of the south side of Chicago changed, increasing numbers of African-American students began to attend the college. By the 1950s, nearly 30% of the student body was black. In 1960 a secondary branch of the Chicago Teacher’s College opened elsewhere in the city which eventually became Northeastern Illinois University. During these years Chicago Teachers College and its branches educated a preponderance of the students who became Chicago Public School system teachers.

Once the state of Illinois took over control of the institution, the student body and programs offered rapidly expanded. The college experienced two more name changes, becoming Chicago State College in 1965 and Chicago State University in 1971, a year before moving to a new campus. By the mid-1960s the college's infrastructure was deteriorating and tensions between the majority white student body and the mostly black surrounding neighborhood were on the rise. Like many campuses, Chicago State College experienced a burst of student activism in 1968 and 1969 as black students and faculty demanded greater attention to their needs and interests and closer relations with the neighborhood. The administration responded by creating an African-American Studies program and cultural center.

In 1972, the university moved to its new location at 9501 S. King Dr., between Burnside and Roseland. The state purchased the site of the Burnside Shops from the Illinois Central Railroad. Classes were suspended for 2 weeks in November to complete the move.

In January 1975, 5,000 students signed a petition on a 45-foot-long (14 m) scroll requesting that President Gerald Ford give the commencement address at graduation that summer. On July 12, 1975, President Ford gave the commencement address at the ceremony held in the Arie Crown Theatre at McCormick Place and received an honorary doctor of laws degree.

=== Late 20th century ===
Shortly thereafter, President Milton Byrd announced his resignation. His replacement, Benjamin Alexander, was the institution's first African-American leader. Under Alexander's command the school received full 10-year accreditation for the first time in its history. Alexander pushed hard to foster multiculturalism, as the African-American portion of the student body swelled from 60% at the outset of the 1970s to over 80% by 1980. These shifting demographics encouraged a debate over whether CSU should be considered a predominantly African-American institution, akin to the HBCUs (Historically Black Colleges and Universities) or whether it should retain a multicultural and multiracial identity. That debate has continued in some form ever since.

President Benjamin Alexander hired Dorothy L. Richey, a Tuskegee University graduate to become the first woman appointed head of athletics at a co-educational college or university in the United States. Her teams excelled during her first year as athletic director in 1975.

The school struggled in the 1980s with enrollments, budgets, and graduation rates. President Dolores Cross helped introduce a sharp increase in enrollment and retention in the 1990s. Enrollment rose 40%, nearing 10,000. The Chicago Tribune dubbed Chicago State "Success U."

In 1990, Gwendolyn Brooks, the well-known poet, was hired as a Distinguished Professor; she taught classes at CSU up until her death. Brooks protégé and English professor Haki R. Madhubuti established a writing center, now called the Gwendolyn Brooks Center for Black Literature and Creative Writing, which hosts a yearly conference and offers the only MFA degree in the country to focus on African American literature.

=== 21st century ===
Elnora Daniel became president in 1998, and she worked to increase federal and state funding and to create new programs. An Honors College was established in 2003 and a College of Pharmacy in 2007. Daniel also oversaw the first doctoral program at CSU in Educational Leadership. The program produced its first graduates in 2009. Special funds were procured to finance a textbook buying program for African schools and two new buildings: the University Library and the Emil and Patricia Jones Convocation Center.

On January 30, 2008, Daniel resigned effective June 30, under allegations of unjustified spending. A state audit found that Daniel spent $15,000 that was expensed as a "leadership conference" on a family cruise instead. When the board of trustees began a search for her replacement, all but two of the faculty members who served on the search committee resigned in protest feeling their concerns were not addressed. Part of their concerns included the graduation rate (only 16.2 percent in 2007) and inadequate infrastructure. On April 29, 2009, the board of trustees appointed retiring City Colleges of Chicago chancellor Wayne Watson as Chicago State's new president. The decision was protested by several students and faculty, who openly booed the announcement, claiming that Watson's appointment was motivated by political considerations rather than the good of the students and faculty. These issues prompted the Higher Learning Commission, the school's accrediting agency, to express "grave" concerns regarding Chicago State's future and indicate that its accreditation might be in jeopardy. However, under Watson's leadership, the school retained and extended its accreditation after the commission's review.

In January 2014, the Chicago Tribune reported that the school's interim provost, Angela Henderson, was under investigation by the University of Illinois at Chicago (UIC) for possible plagiarism of her dissertation. Eventually, UIC cleared Henderson of plagiarism, and Henderson reached a $700,000 settlement with UIC in 2019.

During Watson's tenure, Chicago State University was named as a defendant in several high-profile lawsuits in which whistleblower employees have alleged that they were subjected to retaliatory firings for exposing ethical misconduct on the part of the Watson administration. In one case, a jury awarded a substantial verdict, which totaled over $3 million. A similar 2014 suit charged that Watson improperly hired and promoted administrators and engaged in an inappropriate romantic relationship with an employee. In 2017, Chicago State reached a settlement in that lawsuit, paying nearly $1.3 million to the whistleblower.

In October 2015 the university board unanimously voted to select Thomas J. Calhoun, formerly of the University of North Alabama, to succeed Watson as president. Calhoun entered with a promise to stabilize the school's finances and improve enrollment and graduation rates.

On February 26, 2016, all 900 employees of Chicago State University received layoff notices in anticipation of inadequate funding. Since the Illinois Budget Impasse began in July 2015, Chicago State had zero state funding.

In fall 2016, the freshman class had just 86 students as overall enrollment dropped 25 percent, and in the $84 million university budget for the 2016–17 academic year, the state of Illinois provided only emergency funding to the university.

In September 2016, the university board voted to accept President Calhoun's resignation only nine months after he assumed office, and named Cecil Lucy, the university's vice president for administration and finance, as interim president. The agreement included a $600,000 severance package for the outgoing president and a commitment not to disclose the reasons for the separation. The board's decision received harsh criticism for its lack of transparency and the high cost it imposed on the institution already in the midst of a budget crisis.

On February 4, 2017, the Chicago Tribune revealed that Chicago State spent over $370,000 in tax money on planning activities for a second campus in the West Side of Chicago, including a feasibility study, purchasing property in Homan Square, and hiring an architect. The New York Times reported four days later that Chicago State was considering adding a non-scholarship football team and marching band in order to attract more students from the Chicago public schools. Then in March 2017, Chicago State settled a whistleblower lawsuit filed by former school attorney James Crowley for $4.3 million. Crowley alleged that Chicago State fired him in 2010 in retaliation for reporting misconduct by top administrators.

Zaldwaynaka Scott was unanimously voted by the board of trustees to serve as the 12th permanent president of Chicago State University and assumed the role on July 1, 2018.

== Rankings ==
For 2025, U.S. News & World Report ranked Chicago State Nos.145-160 out of 161 universities, the lowest bracket in Regional Universities Midwest, and tied for No.108 in Top Performers on Social Mobility.

== Undergraduate admissions ==
In 2025, CSU accepted 40.5% of undergraduate applicants, with those enrolled having an average 3.18 high school GPA and standardized test scores with an average 860 SAT score (bottom 25% of scores; 72% submitting), or an average 17 ACT score (bottom 29% of scores; 82% submitting).

== Graduation rates ==
In May 2016, CSU's graduation rate had dropped to 11 percent. The university has historically been the subject of criticism from legislators and accreditors for low graduation rates hovering between 13 and 21 percent. As result, some have suggested that Chicago State could be merged with another Chicago-area university, like Northeastern Illinois University or the City Colleges of Chicago. In 2025, according to US News & World Report, Chicago State had an 11 percent graduation rate within a four-year period of study.

== Buildings ==
=== Emil and Patricia A. Jones Convocation Center ===
The Emil and Patricia Jones Convocation Center is a 7,000-seat multi-purpose on-campus arena was completed in 2007 after three years of construction. It replaced the Jacoby D. Dickens Athletic Center, which only seated 2,500.

=== Jacoby Dickens Center ===
The Jacoby D. Dickens Center (JDC) is home of the Chicago State University Department of Intercollegiate Athletics. The building was built in 1971 and was formerly known as the CSU Athletics Building until 1995, when it was dedicated to renowned Chicago businessman Jacoby D. Dickens. It contains a 2,500-seat gymnasium, three swimming pools, a fitness center, eight locker rooms, three classrooms, a dance studio, an auxiliary and a multipurpose gymnasium. In addition, the building is home to CSU's athletic department and the university's Health and Physical Education and Recreation (HPER) department.

=== Library ===
The university's library, dedicated in October 2006, features an automated storage and retrieval system. It can retrieve five books in 2.5 minutes, on average; the average time for a student to retrieve five books is 2 hours. On October 18, 2018, the library was officially named the Gwendolyn Brooks Library.

== Student life ==
Undergraduate demographics as of fall 2025
Race and ethnicity	Total
Black	75%
Hispanic	11%
Unknown	6%
U.S. Nonresident	3%
White	3%
Asian	1%
American Indian/Alaska Natives	1%
Economic diversity
Low-income (Note: The percentage of students who received an income-based federal Pell grant intended for low-income students.)	65%
Affluent (Note: The percentage of students who are a part of the American middle class at the bare minimum.)	35%

== Athletics ==
Chicago State University sponsors seven men's and eight women's teams in NCAA sanctioned sports. Men's sports include basketball, cross country, golf, soccer, tennis, and track and field. Women's sports include basketball, cross country, golf, soccer, tennis, track and field, and volleyball.

The school's sports teams are called the Cougars, and the team colors are green and white. CSU competes as a member of the Northeast Conference, which they joined in 2024. They previously competed as a Division I independent from 2022 to 2024. From 1994 until June 2006, CSU was a member of the Mid-Continent Conference, but withdrew and took independent status before joining the Great West Conference, in which it played from the 2008–09 through the 2012–13 seasons. Since the Great West Conference did not sponsor basketball during the 2008–09 season, the Cougars' men's and women's basketball teams played as independents that season. From 2013 to 2022, the Cougars competed in the Western Athletic Conference. Prior to gaining NCAA Division I status, the university enjoyed memberships in the National Association of Intercollegiate Athletics (NAIA) and NCAA Division II.

== See also ==
- List of Chicago State University people
