= Aromas, California =

- Census-designated place
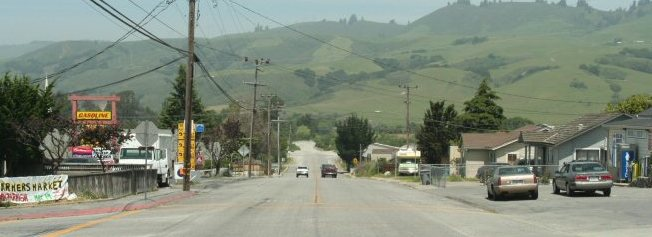
- Downtown Aromas

- Location in Monterey County and the state of California

- Location in San Benito County and the state of California

- Location in the United States
- Coordinates: 36°53′13″N 121°38′29″W
- Country: United States
- State: California
- Counties: Monterey, San Benito

Government
  - State Senators: John Laird (D)
  - Assembly Members: Robert Rivas (D)
  - U. S. Rep.: Zoe Lofgren (D)

Area
  - Total: 4.75 sq mi (12.3 km^{2})
  - Land: 4.74 sq mi (12.3 km^{2})
  - Water: 0.01 sq mi (0.026 km^{2}) 0.22%
- Elevation: 130 ft (40 m)

Population (2020)
  - Total: 2,708
  - Density: 571.91/sq mi (220.82/km^{2})
- Time zone: UTC-8 (PST)
  - Summer (DST): UTC-7 (PDT)
- ZIP code: 95004
- Area code: 831
- FIPS code: 06-02812
- GNIS feature ID: 1657949

Aromas is an unincorporated community and census-designated place (CDP) in Monterey County and San Benito County, California, United States. The population was 2,708 at the 2020 census.

The CDP straddles the border of the two counties, with Monterey County to the west and San Benito County to the east. The Santa Cruz County line is less than a mile to the northwest, and Santa Clara County is about 2 miles (3 km) to the north. Its population was almost equally distributed between the two counties with 1,365 in Monterey County and 1,343 in San Benito County. Aromas is one of four CDPs in California that are divided between two or more counties. The others are Kingvale (divided between Placer County and Nevada County), Kirkwood (divided between Alpine County and Amador County), and Tahoma (divided between Placer County and El Dorado County).

== History ==
The settlement was originally known as "Sand Cut", named from the Southern Pacific Railroad tunnel constructed nearby in 1871. The settlement was renamed Aromas, after Rancho Las Aromitas y Agua Caliente, around 1895.

== Geography ==
Aromas is located in northern Monterey County and northwestern San Benito County at 36°53′13″N 121°38′29″W (36.886988, -121.641396). Is it bordered to the south by Prunedale. U.S. Route 101 runs along the southeastern edge of the community, leading north 13 miles (21 km) to Gilroy and south 14 miles (23 km) to Salinas.

According to the United States Census Bureau, the Aromas CDP has a total area of 4.75 square miles (12.3 km^{2}), of which 4.74 square miles (12.3 km^{2}) are land and 0.01 square miles (0.026 km^{2}), or 0.22%, are water. The center of town lies on the south side of the valley of the Pajaro River, approximately 1 mile (1.6 km) southwest of where the river cuts through Pajaro Gap (Chittenden Pass) at the south end of the Santa Cruz Mountains.

== Demographics ==
Historical population
| Census | Pop. | Note | %± |
|---|---|---|---|
| 1990 | 2,275 | | — |
| 2000 | 2,797 | | 22.9% |
| 2010 | 2,650 | | −5.3% |
| 2020 | 2,708 | | 2.2% |
U.S. Decennial Census; 1860–1870 1880-1890; 1900 1910 1920; 1930 1940 1950; 1960 1970 1980; 1990 2000 2010

Aromas first appeared as a census-designated place in the 1990 United States census.

=== 2020 census ===
As of the 2020 census, Aromas had a population of 2,708 and a population density of 571.9 inhabitants per square mile (220.8/km^{2}). The median age was 43.9 years. 17.6% of residents were under the age of 18 and 21.3% were 65 years of age or older. For every 100 females, there were 102.5 males, and for every 100 females age 18 and over, there were 97.2 males age 18 and over.

The census reported that 100% of the population lived in households. There were 910 households, out of which 30.2% included children under the age of 18, 61.2% were married-couple households, 5.9% were cohabiting couple households, 19.2% had a female householder with no partner present, and 13.6% had a male householder with no partner present. 17.4% of households were one person, and 11.0% were one person aged 65 or older. The average household size was 2.98. There were 693 families (76.2% of all households).

0.0% of residents lived in urban areas, while 100.0% lived in rural areas.

There were 954 housing units at an average density of 201.5 units per square mile (77.8 units/km^{2}), of which 910 (95.4%) were occupied. Of these, 79.8% were owner-occupied and 20.2% were occupied by renters. 4.6% of housing units were vacant. The homeowner vacancy rate was 0.4% and the rental vacancy rate was 5.2%.

Racial composition as of the 2020 census
| Race | Number | Percent |
|---|---|---|
| White | 1,589 | 58.7% |
| Black or African American | 17 | 0.6% |
| American Indian and Alaska Native | 56 | 2.1% |
| Asian | 83 | 3.1% |
| Native Hawaiian and Other Pacific Islander | 4 | 0.1% |
| Some other race | 595 | 22.0% |
| Two or more races | 364 | 13.4% |
| Hispanic or Latino (of any race) | 1,105 | 40.8% |

== Schools ==
The Aromas-San Juan School District has three schools – Aromas Elementary School, San Juan School and Anzar High School. Aromas has one K-8 school, Aromas Elementary School with less than 400 students, (in 2000). Heather Howell is the current principal of Aromas School. Anzar High School, which opened in 1994, was named after early area pioneers. Anzar's current principal is Angela Crawley, and the school's total enrollment amounts to 258 students.

== Economy ==
Aromas is home to a Graniterock quarry, with the A.R. Wilson quarry owned and operated by the Watsonville-based company.

Since 1986, Fireclay Tile has been manufacturing architectural tile in Aromas.
