= William Nicholas Hailmann =

American educator (1836–1920)

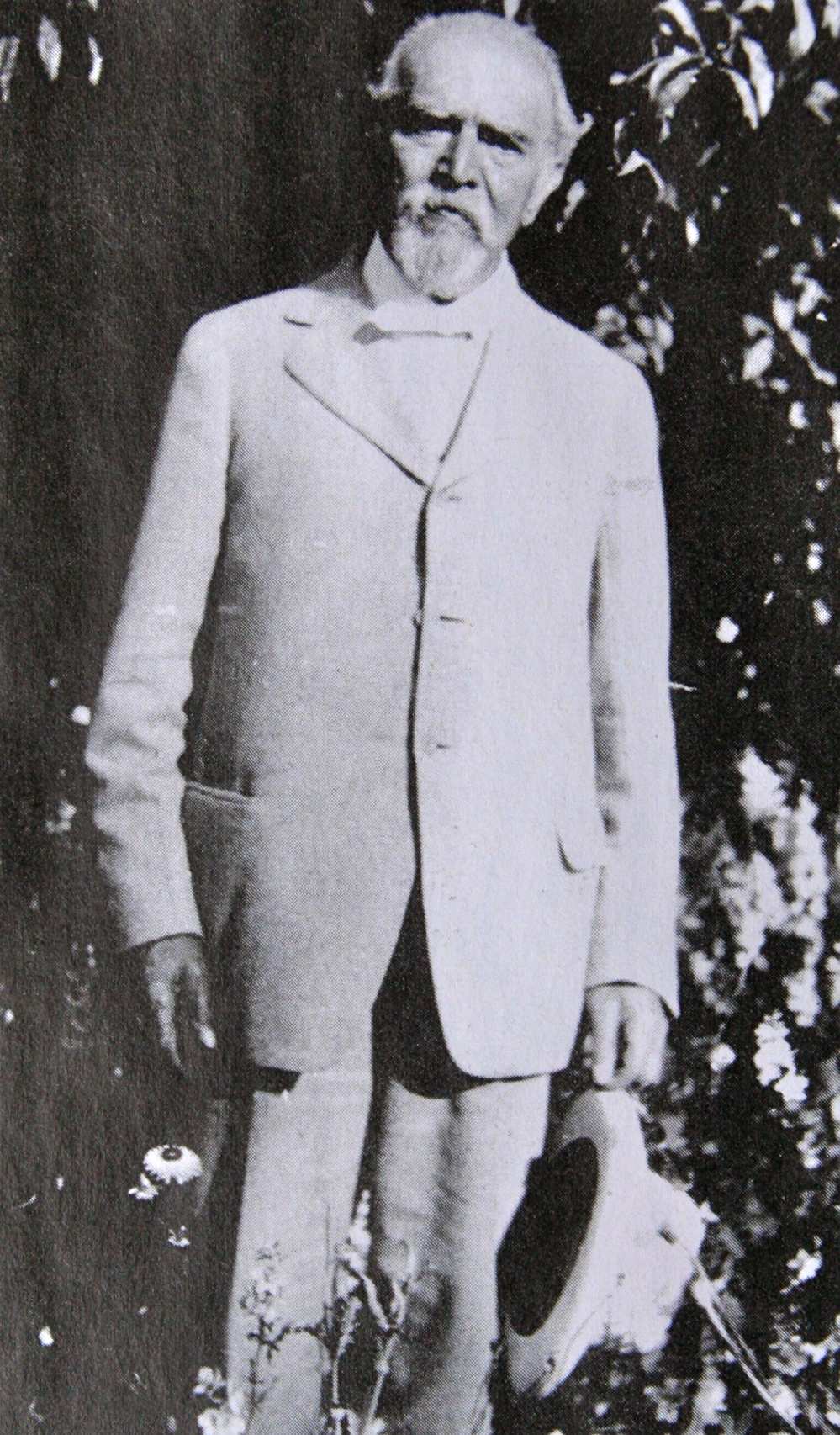
- Born: October 20, 1836; Glarus, Switzerland
- Died: May 13, 1920 (aged 83); Pasadena, California, U.S.
- Resting place: Riverside Cemetery, North Reading, Massachusetts, U.S.
- Education: Ohio University (PhD)
- Occupation: Educator
- Spouses: Eudora Lucas (m. 1857; died 1904) Helena Kuhn (m. 1907)

William Nicholas Hailmann (20 October 1836 Glarus, Switzerland – 13 May 1920 Pasadena, California) was an American educator. He was a progressive educator and helped introduce the kindergarten into the United States.

== Biography ==
He was educated in the gymnasium at Zürich, studied in Medical College of Louisville, Kentucky, and received a Ph.D. from Ohio University in 1885. He taught natural science in the Louisville high schools from 1856 to 1865, and then directed the German and English Academy from 1865 to 1873, where he built the first kindergarten classroom in the United States. He eventually became president of the Froebel Institute of North America.

From 1873 to 1878, he directed the German and English Academy in Milwaukee, Wisconsin, and then the German-American Seminary of Detroit, Michigan, from 1878 to 1883. He was superintendent of public schools of Laporte, Indiana, from 1883 to 1894. From 1894 to 1898 he superintended the Indian School Service of the United States and worked to hire more Native American teachers for the Service. He was superintendent of instruction in Dayton, Ohio from 1898 to 1903 and head of the department of psychology of the Chicago Normal School, 1904 to 1909. From 1909 to 1915, he was head of department of education at the Normal Training School, Cleveland, Ohio. He retired to Pasadena, California in 1915.

He was buried in Riverside Cemetery, North Reading, Massachusetts upon his death.

== Works ==
- Outlines of a System of Object-teaching (1866)
- History of Pedagogy (1870)
- Kindergarten Culture (1872)
- The Law of Childhood (1878)
- Primary Methods (1887)
- Application of Psychology to Teaching (1887)
- The English Language (1902)

He translated Froebel's Education of Man into English (1890), and edited Erziehungsblaetter (1870–83) and Kindergarten Messenger and New Education (1876–84). From 1883 to 1894, he was one of the chief contributors of the National Education Association in the interest of the kindergarten and other features of the new education.

== Family ==
He married Eudora Lucas of Louisville on 24 December 1857. She was an associate in his efforts to introduce the kindergarten system to the United States. She died in 1904, and he married Helena Kuhn of Detroit on 25 December 1907.
