= Glidden Parker =

American artist and designer

Glidden McLellan Parker Jr. (1913–1980) was an American artist and designer who is best known for his work in ceramics and stained glass. He established Glidden Pottery in Alfred, New York and later was chief designer for Glass Art Studio in Scottsdale, Arizona.

== Early life ==
Glidden McLellan Parker Jr. was born in Phillips, Maine. He studied literature at Bates College in Lewiston, Maine with the intention of becoming a writer and received a BA in 1935. After furthering his studies in Vienna for a year he returned to Maine to write a novel that was never published. He became interested in ceramics and attended the New York State College of Ceramics at Alfred University in Alfred, New York as a special graduate student from 1937 to 1939 studying under Katherine Nelson, Marion Fosdick and Don Schreckengost.

== Professional career ==
In 1940, Parker established Glidden Pottery in Alfred, New York. Parker sold his stoneware dinnerware to department stores in New York City. At its peak, Glidden Pottery had fifty-five employees and produced 150,000 pieces per year. Gliddenware was featured in magazines such as Better Homes and Gardens, Good Housekeeping, and House Beautiful. Lucille Ball and Desi Arnaz owned a complete set of Gliddenware, and pieces can be seen in some episodes of the television series I Love Lucy. Inexpensive imported dinnerware negatively impacted sales of Glidden Pottery and the company closed in 1957.

In 1962 Parker was hired by Raymond Loewy to teach pottery in his ceramic studio in Puerto Rico. A few years later, he left Puerto Rico to take a job as a stained-glass designer for Glass Art Studio in Scottsdale, Arizona, where he remained into the mid-1970s. He then moved to Santa Fe, New Mexico, where he designed ceramic sculpture.

== Selected exhibitions and awards ==
- Ceramic National exhibitions 1938, 1939, 1947, 1949, 1951, and 1952. Syracuse Museum of Fine Arts (now the Everson Museum). Purchase prize in 1949 for “best ceramic design suitable for mass production.”
- Good Design, September 22 – November 29, 1953, Museum of Modern Art.
- Good Design, November 21, 1950 – January 28, 1951, Museum of Modern Art
- 100 Useful Objects of Fine Design (available under $100), September 16, 1947 – January 25, 1948, Museum of Modern Art
- Useful Objects, November 26, 1946 – January 26, 1947, Museum of Modern Art
- Glidden Pottery, April 12 – September 27, 2001, Schein-Joseph Museum of Ceramic Art at Alfred (now the Alfred Ceramic Art Museum), Alfred University, Alfred, NY.

== Selected collections ==
- Alfred Ceramic Art Museum
- Brooklyn Museum
- Cooper-Hewett
- Everson Museum
- Flint Institute of Art
- International Museum of Dinnerware Design

== Selected stained glass installations ==
- CP Federal City Square, Jackson, Michigan
- Trinity Episcopal Cathedral, Phoenix, Arizona
- Episcopal Diocese of California, Saint Anselm's Episcopal Church, Lafayette, California
