= Clare Twomey =

British artist and researcher

Clare Twomey MBE
- Born: 1968 (age 57–58)
- Education: Edinburgh College of Art, Royal College of Art
- Known for: Ceramic installations
- Website: www.claretwomey.com

Clare Twomey MBE (born 1968 in Ipswich) is a London-based visual artist, curator and researcher, working in performance, serial production, and site-specific installation. Her practice encompasses site-specific installation and performance; she frequently collaborates with institutions, encouraging participation and temporality.

== Education and academic career ==
Twomey attended the Edinburgh College of Art from 1991 to 1994 and received an MA in Ceramics and Glass from the Royal College of Art in London in 1996. In 2011 she became a Research Fellow in the School of Media, Arts and Design at the University of Westminster, where she is affiliated with the Ceramics Research Centre.

== Work ==
Twomey's work typically involves intense research, collaboration in fabrication, and interactive presentations. A recurring theme in her work is the relationship that binds people to things. Her use of the medium of clay involves various forms of the material, including raw clay and powder, and techniques and processes including slip cast and factory production. Twomey sees her practice as research: she has explained that she is "engaged in a process of inquiry, an exploration of ideas, predicated on exploring characteristics of clay."

Twomey was appointed Member of the Order of the British Empire (MBE) in the 2022 New Year Honours for services to art.

== Selected works ==
=== Consciousness/conscience ===
Between 2001 and 2004 Consciousness/conscience was exhibited in a variety of places including the Tate, Liverpool; Crafts Council, London; and Icheon, Korea. At each of the sites of installation, between 3000 and 8000 hollow bone china tiles were created to be displayed on the floor. As the viewer walked through the installation, the tiles were crushed underfoot, causing the viewer to be an active participant in shaping the work and challenging the viewer's perception of both the gallery space and the permanence of the work. The artwork was thus completed through the destruction of the tiles. Consciousness/Conscience has been interpreted as showing how the artist's work is "influenced by observations of human interaction and political behavior and peruses her interest in space, architecture, intervention and the gallery as destination."

=== Trophy ===
In 2006 Trophy was exhibited at the Victorian and Albert Museum. This one-day exhibition displayed 4000 sculptures of cast bluebirds that were created at the Wedgwood Factory. Each bluebird was stamped with a W for where it was made, V&A for where it would be exhibited, and CT for the artist's initials. Viewers became collaborative performers when they were asked to take one of the birds home as a 'Trophy.' These active participants who took these trophies were asked to send a photograph back to Twomey of the birds in their new home. "Trophy continues to develop as is spreads out across hundreds of private locations"

=== Monument ===
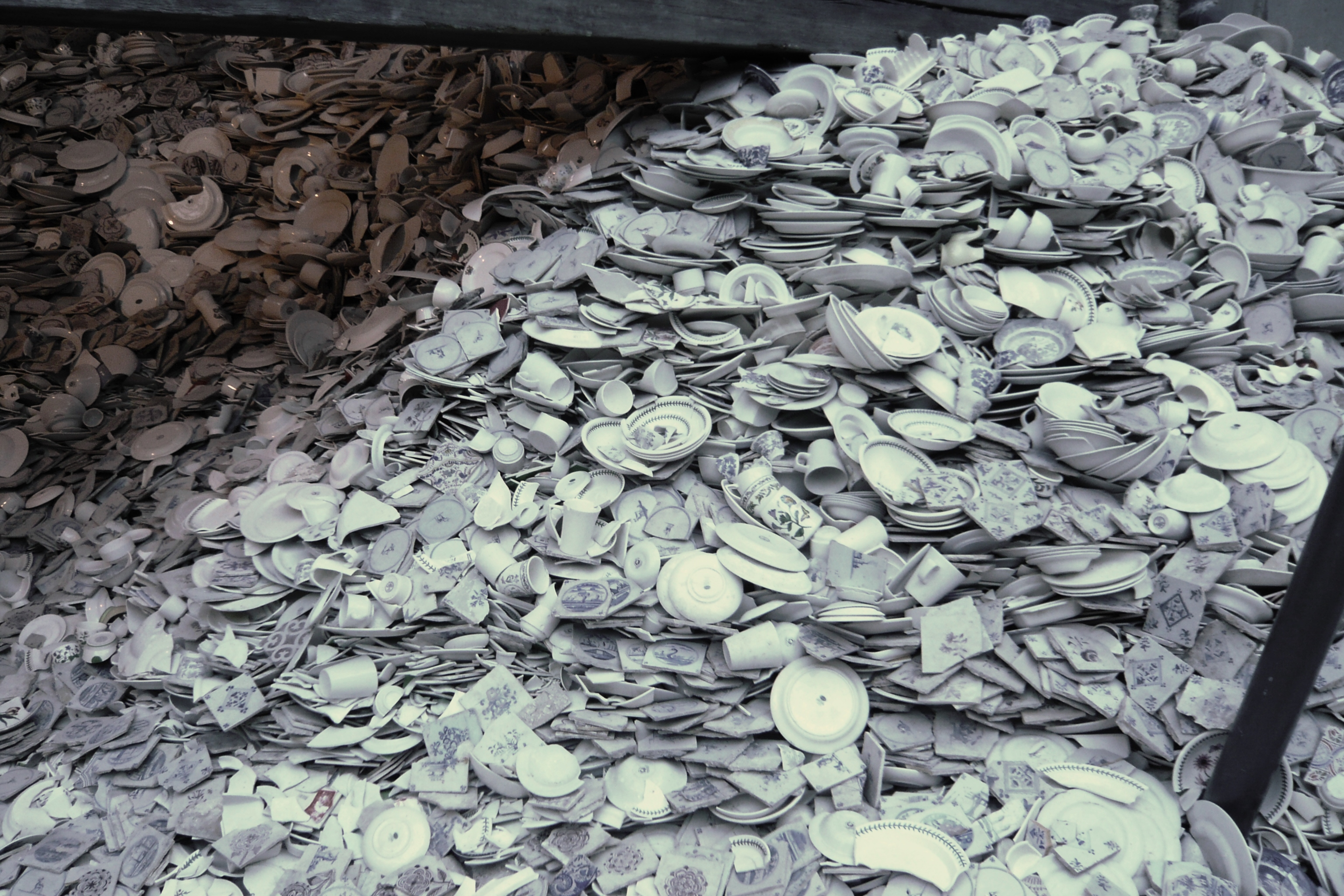
Clare Twomey's Monument installed at the Enkhuizen Zuiderzee Museum

In 2009, Clare Twomey created the work Monument for the Middlesbrough Institute of Modern Art as part of the exhibition Possibilities and Losses: Transitions in Clay, which she helped to curate. This exhibition included Keith Harrison, Linda Sormin and Neil Brownsword. For Monument, 30 cubic meters of ceramic waste were piled up 8 meters high. Inspired by looking at a pile of broken china from the Johnson Porcelain Tile Factory in Stoke-on-Trent, this piece was made up of discarded seconds and manufacturing mistakes. The scale of the pile created tension in the work because the pile seemed as though it could crumble at any moment.

=== Forever ===
In Twomey's first solo American show (2011), Twomey observed the Frank and Harriet Burnlaps collection of 1,345 pieces of ceramics at the Nelson Atkins Museum of Art. In this exhibition she explored permanence, responsibility, memory, desirability, the value and process of making through looking at one specific item from the collection, a sandbach cup. Twomey worked with the ceramic company, Hartley Greens and Co. Leeds Pottery to cast 1,345 cups. Working from a similar conceptual framework as Trophy, Twomey created a system where viewers could apply to own a cup if they signed a contract promising to take care of the cup forever.

=== Collecting the Edges ===
In 2011 Twomey created a museum wide installation at the Denver Art Museum in conjunction with Overthrown, Clay without Limits. This group show included artists such as Annabeth Rosen, Kristen Morgin, Jeanne Quinn, Walter McConnell, Heather Mae Ericsson, and Kim Dickey as well as many others. Collecting the Edges brought attention to the museum's architecture by creating a visual intervention which highlighted corners, ceilings and other spaces in the museum. Collecting the Edges piled red, powdered, Colorado clay into these specific spaces spreading the exhibition throughout the whole museum. In an interview in Ceramics Now, Twomey stated "When visiting a site, one must arrive with a very open mind, I had our first visit with no planned ideas for the work. I made a response to the architecture experienced, and this was vastly influential with the development of the concept." She then goes on to state that she sees this piece as "A reminder of a moment in time, rather than a demand."

=== Humanity is in Our Hands ===
For Humanity In Our Hands, Clare Twomey, along with many other artists worked with the Keep the Memory Alive project, whose mission is to pair survivors of genocide with artists to bring their stories to life for the next generation. Twomey was paired with Siskc Jakupovic, who survived the Omarska Concentration Camp in the Bosnian War. In one of their exchanges Jakupovic shared a story about how in the concentration camp, they carved spoons for each other out of wood and shards of broken glass. From this story, and with the analogy that spoons can nurture and feed each other, Twomey created her piece Humanity is in our Hands.

On 27 January 2015, Holocaust Remembrance Day, Twomey distributed invitations to people walking over Westminster Bridge. "Today you are invited to be part of a new work, your words will be placed on thousands of beautiful porcelain objects that will be made in the coming year. These objects will be handed back to the public as gifts on Westminster Bridge, on this date one year from now, 27th of January 2016. The recipients will become custodians of your thoughts." The question she asked the pedestrians walking over the bridge was 'What human qualities allow society of flourish?' Over the next year Twomey created 2000 porcelain spoons with the answers she received. The following year, on 27 January 2016, she gave the spoons back to the pedestrians on the bridge.

== Exhibits ==
- 2024 Continuum - Palácio Nacional da Ajuda, Lisbon, Portugal
- 2024 The Invisible Vase - Portland Vase Mania & Muse, Crocker Art Museum USA
- 2023 Anatomy of Time - Public Art Commission Bond St, Elizabeth Line, London
- 2022 Monument - Museum of Modern Art Paris, France
- 2021 Derek Jarman Prospect Cottage - Art Fund Prospect Cottage fund
- 2019 Medals For The Future - National Memorial Arboretum, UK
- 2019 Monument- The Golden Thread - Zuiderzee Museum, Holland
- 2018 Vase: Silkeborg - Asger Jorn Museum, Denmark
- 2017 FACTORY: the seen and the unseen - Tate Modern, UK
- 2017 Made in China - Yale Center for British Art Yale, USA
- 2017 Wuthering Heights: a manuscript - Bronte Parsonage Museum, UK
- 2017 Time Present. Time Past - William Morris Gallery, UK
- 2016 Manifest: 10,000 hours - York Art Gallery, York, UK
- 2016 Humanity is in Our Hands, In conjunction with Keep the Memory Alive
- 2014 Piece by Piece, The Gardiner Museum, Toronto, Canada
- 2013 Exchange, Foundling Museum, London, UK
- 2012 Clare Twomey-Plymouth Porcelain: A New Collection, Plymouth City Museum and Art Gallery
- 2011 Present Traces, The Magic of Clay, Holtegaard, Denmark
- 2011 Overthrown: Clay without Limits, Denver Art Museum
- 2010 Made in China, West Norway Museum of Decorative Art, Bergen, Norway
- 2010 Is it Madness. Is it Beauty, Siobhan Davies Studios, London, UK
- 2010 Forever, The Nelson-Atkins Museum of Art, Kansas, USA
- 2010 A Dark Day in Paradise, the Royal Pavilion, Brighton, UK
- 2009 Specimen, Royal Academy of Arts, London, UK
- 2009 The Collection, Victoria and Albert Museum, London, UK
- 2009 Monument, Zuiderzee Museum, Holland
- 2008 Witness, Jerwood Space, London UK
- 2007 Blossom, Eden Project, UK
- 2006 Scribe, Dr Johnson's House, London, UK
- 2006 Trophy, Victoria and Albert Museum, London UK
- 2004 Heirloom, Misson Gallery, Swansea
- 2001-2004 Consciousness/Conscience, Tate, Liverpool, Craft Council London, and Icheon Korea

== Awards ==
Twomey received the AHRC Behind the Scenes at the Museum award from the University of Westminster, London in 2011. She has twice been awarded ACE funding: in 2009 for Specimen at the Royal Academy, and in 2006 for Trophy at the Victoria and Albert Museum. In 2004, Twomey became an AHRC Research Fellow with the University of Westminster, and in 2002 the London Visual Arts Fund put her on the London Arts Board. In 2001 she won the City of Nyon Exhibition Prize at the Porcelain Triennial Exhibition and was added to the Selected Makers Index of the Crafts Council. In 1999 Twomey received an exhibition prize at Ceramic Contemporaries 3 and in 1998 she received the membership award of the Royal British Society of Sculptors.

== Public collections ==
Twomey's work is included in a number of significant public and private collections, including the Swiss National Museum in Nyon, Switzerland, the Museo Internazionale Delle Ceramiche in Faenza, Italy, the Hungarian National Ceramics Collection in Kesckemet Hungary, in the entrance atrium at the Great Ormond Street Hospital in London, the national archive of The Wedgwood Collection in Great Britain and the Victoria and Albert Museum in London, England.
