= Arnold Zimmerman =

American sculptor (1954–2021)

- Arnold Zimmerman at work in his studio in 1982.
- Born: December 13, 1954; Poughkeepsie, New York, United States
- Died: 2021 (aged 66–67)
- Education: New York State College of Ceramics at Alfred University, Kansas City Art Institute
- Known for: Sculpture, installation art, figurative art
- Spouse: Ann Rosenthal
- Children: Isabel Rosenthal Zimmerman
- Awards: Louis Comfort Tiffany Foundation, National Endowment for the Arts, New York Foundation for the Arts
- Website: Arnie Zimmerman

Arnold Zimmerman, Untitled carved stoneware sculpture, Honolulu Museum of Art

Arnold Zimmerman (1954-2021), also known as Arnie Zimmerman, was an American sculptor and ceramic artist. His work ranged from monumental to miniature, and abstract to figurative, encompassing totemic vessel forms, tabletop sculpture and figures, murals, and room-size installations. He was part of a multi-decade, 20th-century shift in American ceramics during which artists challenged clay's identification with function and craft, engaging fine-art domains such as emotional expression, social commentary, figuration and narrative. Zimmerman first gained recognition in the 1980s for deeply carved, architectonic sculptures characterized by rough physicality, rhythmic surfaces, gestural presence and Italian Romanesque influences. In the mid-1990s, he shifted to figurative work that critic Donald Kuspit wrote, examined the interaction of finite man and infinite matter, artist and creative work: "There is a sense of futility and folly as well as seemingly senseless idealism and innocence built into Zimmerman's parables of the all-too-human."

Zimmerman's art belongs to the public collections of the Metropolitan Museum of Art, Los Angeles County Museum of Art, Smithsonian American Art Museum, and Brooklyn Museum, among others. In 2021, his work appeared in the Metropolitan Museum exhibition, "Shapes From Out of Nowhere." He received fellowships and awards from organizations including the National Endowment for the Arts, Louis Comfort Tiffany Foundation and New York Foundation for the Arts. Zimmerman, who worked out of a Brooklyn, New York studio for most of his career, died in Hudson, New York in 2021.

== Early life and career ==
Zimmerman was born December 13, 1954, in Poughkeepsie, New York and grew up in Ossining, New York. He apprenticed as a potter in Lincolnshire, England prior to enrolling at the Kansas City Art Institute, where he studied under ceramic artist Ken Ferguson and earned a BFA In 1977. Prior to graduating, Zimmerman studied stone carving at a Lacoste, Provence, France limestone quarry, an experience that figured prominently in his early work. He continued his studies at New York State College of Ceramics at Alfred University completing an MFA in 1979.

In the early 1980s, Zimmerman moved to New York City and opened a studio in a converted Williamsburg, Brooklyn factory in 1983. In his first professional decade, he appeared in major ceramics surveys at the Museum of Contemporary Crafts, SUNY Stonybrook, American Craft Museum, Seattle Art Museum, and National Museum of Ceramic Art, among others. Five of his monumental works were also selected by the Everson Museum of Art—noted for its ceramics collection—to line the front entrance of its building. During that period, he met his wife, Ann Rosenthal, a member of the avant-garde theater scene then working at the performance space Franklin Furnace.

In his later career, Zimmerman had solo shows at the Garth Clark Gallery, Daum Museum of Contemporary Art, Sherry Leedy Contemporary Art, Museu do Azulejo, Snug Harbor Cultural Center, Greenwich House Pottery, and Rhode Island School of Design Museum (RISD), among others. His work also appeared in surveys at the Katonah Museum of Art, Islip Art Museum, Neuberger Museum of Art, and Kemper Museum of Contemporary Art.

== Work and reception ==
Zimmerman's art embodied the movement of ceramics into the mainstream of contemporary sculpture through successive bodies of work exploring modernist abstraction, figural expression, and moral and philosophical themes. He drew on a wide range of art historical sources, from Tuscan Romanesque and Manueline Portuguese gothic architecture to humanistic artists such as Pieter Bruegel and Honoré Daumier to analytic cubism. In the 1980s, Zimmerman first received recognition for monolithic works that combined elements of monumental, figurative and relief sculpture and the ceramic vessel tradition. In the 1990s, his work became increasingly fantastical, employing intricate modeling and glazing in anthropomorphic sculptures, and eventually, multi-figure, narrative tableaux. Art historian Judy Collischan related this sculpture to the work of Hieronymus Bosch and Bruegel writing, "Zimmerman’s fascination with exaggeration and the bizarre … is in line with the grotesque, a decorative form of art that intertwines elements from human, animal, and foliage sources … There is a blend of humor with deformity [that] combines anthropomorphic form with a moralizing content that relates a lesson about pretense and folly." With the sprawling, 200-piece installation, Inner City (2007–10), Zimmerman fashioned these tableaux into entire cities and populations.

Arnold Zimmerman, Vapor 1, 26.5" high, 1992 (left) and Bladder Tongue and Tangle, 23.75" high, 1994 (right). Exhibition image, Metropolitan Museum of Art.

=== Early monumental sculpture ===
Zimmerman's early monumental works of blue, pink, green and tan earthenware employed exaggerated scale, carved reliefs, and implicit figuration with a body/vessel duality. Critics described the massive pieces as masculine, brawny and expressive. Zimmerman hand-built them in thick, three-to-five-inch walls or coils that were dried and fired slowly, which enabled deep carving. Their dominant forms—influenced by Romanesque stone columns and pilasters—departed from the symmetrical, neck-shoulder-belly structure of conventional vessels, using exaggerated proportions and twisting, undulating stances that captured human movement in ways writers described as eerie, humorous and gendered.

Zimmerman energized the work with rebus-like, rhythmic, carved abstract and geometric shapes, ridges, symbols and curvilinear motifs, as well as primal surfaces showing evident finger marks, scrapes and paddle lines. New York Times critic Helen Harrison wrote that the sculpture had "a mysterious and commanding presence … like huge ceremonial objects created by some unknown culture [whose] symbolic marks … seem to indicate hidden meanings that only the initiated may decipher. The roughness of the clay body and the crudely formed undulations of the shape contribute to the feeling of primitive mystery." In the late 1980s, Zimmerman turned from vessels to column-like, gate and arch structures with more representational, carved forms that referenced architectural styles of ancient Crete, the Middle East, and Manueline Portugal (e.g., Arch, 1988).

Arnold Zimmerman, Fool's Congress Part 2, unglazed terra cotta, 72" x 144" x 50", 1999. Installation, Neuberger Museum of Art.

=== Figurative sculpture ===
The 1990s was a decade of greater formal experimentation for Zimmerman, which extended to figurines, tabletop pieces, fountain and tile works, and multi-figure tableaux. He was greatly influenced by travel, including a residency at the Sant'Anna tile works in Portugal, where he explored the Azulejo decorative tradition, which often features exotic or grotesque plant, creature and maritime motifs. His work there resulted in a series of colorful, attenuated and flattened totems whose whimsical imagery—incorporating elemental motifs and condensed symbols such as tradesman's insignias—hinted variously at fantastical figures or heraldry.

These figurative approaches laid the foundation for a series of pedestal to tabletop-sized sculptures that critics described as "strange cleavages of machine and flesh" bridging his monumental carvings and later narrative work. They employed subtle color, thick crawling layers of glaze, and tangles of manipulated clay conveying intimacy, individuality, and vulnerable, organic immediacy in contrast to the raw, herculean and communal qualities of his past work. Pieces such as Venus I or Vapor (both 1992) combined an awkward corporeality with elements of mechanical purpose (wheels, chains, axles, fountains), creating an unsettling, hybrid presence. American Ceramics reviewer Judy Clowes called them "objects of tremendous power and intrigue [that] seem to writhe and ooze quietly … Their slightly threatening strangeness calls up simultaneously one's fears of tumorous growth and of machinery gone berserk." Describing a column of earth-toned, oozing spheres strangled by mushrooming globules and projectiles (Marváo II), critic Vanessa Lynn suggested this work explored creative energy, blocked or harnessed (as in the writhing, triumphant linear tube of Pé de Marváo).

In the mid-1990s, Zimmerman shifted from totemic works to metaphorical, salt-fired porcelain pieces in the modeled, figure tradition that depicted amorphous, polyp-like figures writhing in sexual hijinks or violence (e.g., The Ferry or Fool's Paradise, both 1996). These multi-figure works led to the 12-foot wide, unglazed terracotta piece, Fool's Congress Part 2 (1999), a macabre chorus of semi-abstract vertical forms capped by rudimentary heads and connected by tubular limbs and tendrils; the red clay characters "burning" with hypocrisy and shame were intended to convey senses of pretense, harmlessness and the bizarre. Subsequent multi-figure works took on a more representational and mythic quality, depicting small, vulnerable people busy building structures or monuments that seemed precarious or set to drift off into a void (e.g., Hell's Gate, 2002; Fool's Ship on Babel, 2003). Donald Kuspit considered them parables of folly, ambition and absurdity as well as metaphors for the creative process, however, Ellen Paul Denker of American Craft argued that they expressed not folly, but concern with daily life and the dignity of ordinary tasks.

==== Inner City and later work ====
Arnold Zimmerman and Tiago Montepegado, Inner City, dimensions variable, 2009. Installation image (left) and detail (right), Rhode Island School of Design Museum.

Zimmerman's interests in human labor and ambition were perhaps most fully realized in Inner City (2005–9), a collaborative work involving more than 200 of his sculptures that architect Tiago Montepegado designed as site-specific installations at Museu da Electricidade (2007, Lisbon), Keramiekmuseum Princessehof (2008, The Netherlands), and the RISD Museum (2009). The handcrafted, closely observed clay pieces depicted a sprawl of Lilliputian craftspeople, objects (tools, i-beams, ladders), and architectural elements (chimneys, stairs, bridges, buildings, walkways) arranged in Manhattan-like grids and scenarios—accidents, setbacks, miscommunications, labor and recreation—that functioned like film stills or dream images. Critics suggested the installations explored tensions between the recklessness and awe of modern demolition and expansion, individuality, and the constraints of contemporary cities and structures, while also suggesting a metaphor for the mind. They likened the work's themes to Balzac's La Comédie Humaine, Fritz Lang's urban dystopia Metropolis, Depression-era Hollywood movies, and to art capturing the "heavy lyricism of human toil" by Bruegel, Bosch, James Ensor and Philip Guston.

In 2014, Zimmerman left New York City and built a state-of-the-art studio in Hudson, where he would also create a sculpture garden and a gallery named for his daughter, called Izzy's Room. During this period, he explored classical figure sculpting and created an outdoor series of idiosyncratic planters for the garden that formally recalled his early monumental vessels.

== Awards and public collections ==
Zimmerman's work belongs to the public collections of the Alfred Ceramic Art Museum, Brooklyn Museum, Chazen Museum of Art, Daum Museum of Contemporary Art, Detroit Institute of Arts, Everson Museum of Art, Frost Art Museum, Honolulu Museum of Art, Keramiekmuseum Princessehof, Los Angeles County Museum of Art, Metropolitan Museum of Art, Milwaukee Art Museum, Mint Museum of Art, Museum of Arts and Design, Museum of Decorative Arts (Montreal), Museu do Azulejo, Philadelphia Museum of Art, Smithsonian American Art Museum, and Yellowstone Art Museum, among others.

Zimmerman received fellowships from the Louis Comfort Tiffany Foundation (2005), New York Foundation for the Arts (1999, 1991, 1987), National Endowment for the Arts (1990, 1986, 1982), and the Connecticut Commission on the Arts (1981). He was awarded artist residencies by Eschenbach Porzellan (Germany, 2014–17), World Ceramic Exposition Foundation (Korea, 2005), Shigaraki Ceramic Cultural Park (Japan, 2000), Arts International/Lila Wallace-Reader's Digest Fund (Portugal, 1992), and the Kohler Arts Industry Program (1991, 1989).
