= Heather Mae Erickson =

American artist (born 1977)

- Born: February 22, 1977; Wilmington, DE
- Known for: Ceramics and Education

Heather Mae Erickson (born February 22, 1977) is an artist, a craftsperson, and a designer.

== Early life ==
Erickson was born at Wilmington General Hospital in Wilmington, Delaware. She is the middle child of Eric Blaine Erickson and Janet Diane Erickson (née Snyder). Her father is a Terminal Trainmaster/Haz Mat Sentinel at CSX Transportation in Walbridge, Ohio and her mother is a homemaker. Erickson moved frequently in her early life, living with her family in New Castle, Delaware, from 1977 to 1978, in Mantua, Ohio, from 1978 to 1979, in Lindenwold, New Jersey, from 1979 to 1980, in Runnemede, New Jersey, from 1980 to 1981 (where she attended Bingham Elementary School), in Laurel Springs, New Jersey, from 1981 to 1994 (where she attended Laurel Springs Elementary, Samuel S. Yellin Junior High in Stratford, and half of her first year at Sterling High School in Somerdale), and in Sylvania, Ohio, from 1994 to 1996 (where she attended Sylvania Southview High School and was a member of the Cougarettes varsity precision dance team).

== Education ==
Erickson moved to Philadelphia, Pennsylvania, where she earned her BFA in Crafts with a concentration in Ceramics and Art Education K-12 Pre-Certification at The University of the Arts (1996–2000). In December 2000, Erickson returned to Sylvania, Ohio, and continued studio work in her parents' basement, became a member of the Toledo Potters' Guild where she glazed/fired her work, took part in exhibitions, ran the Seagate Gallery in Toledo, taught at art centers, and substitute taught for Toledo Public Schools. In September 2002 Erickson began her MFA in Ceramics at Cranbrook Academy of Art in Bloomfield Hills, Michigan, under Resident Artist, Tony Hepburn.

== Career ==
Erickson spent the summer after graduation from Cranbrook as a resident artist at the Archie Bray Foundation in Helena, Montana. From 2004 to 2005, Erickson was awarded a Fulbright Scholarship to conduct independent research at The University of Art and Design (now Aalto University) in Helsinki, Finland. Upon her return from Finland, Erickson continued her work as a resident artist at The Clay Studio in Philadelphia, Pennsylvania, for three years. During this time, she also taught at The University of the Arts, Rowan University, Arcadia University, and various art centers in and around the city.

Erickson currently resides in Sylva, North Carolina, and is Assistant Professor and Head of Ceramics at Western Carolina University in Cullowhee.

== Recognition ==
Erickson's work has been shown internationally and is represented in collections around the world. She has earned numerous awards, including first place for the Horizon Award presented by the Museum of Art and Design in New York and honorable mentions at the Korea Biennale International 2007 & 2009 Exhibitions. The Horizon Awards acknowledge the achievements of young and emerging artists and designers. "Erickson's work represents the excitement that is now infusing functional ceramics," said Tony Hepburn, head of Ceramics at Cranbrook. "It is simply the hybridizing of craft and design. Upbeat, innovative, employing new technologies and allowing this new world to help us rethink how we think about the objects we use."

She was awarded an Independence Fellowship for a summer 2009 residency at The International Ceramic Research Center in Denmark. Erickson was the 2009–2012 Robert Chapman Turner Teaching Fellow in Ceramic Art at the New York State College of Ceramics at Alfred University. From 2012 to 2013, she lived in Golden, Colorado, where she taught part-time at Rocky Mountain College of Art and Design, Red Rocks Community College, Colorado Mountain College-Aspen Campus, and Arapahoe Community College. She moved to Boulder, Colorado, from 2013 to 2014, where she served as visiting teaching artist/sabbatical replacement for artist/professor Jeanne Quinn at The University of Colorado in Boulder.

== Residencies ==
- 2013 The University of Colorado at Boulder. Visiting Teaching Artist. Boulder, CO
- 2012 The University of the Arts. Summer Artist in Residence. Philadelphia, PA
- 2009 Robert Chapman Turner Teaching Fellowship in Ceramic Art. NYSCC at Alfred University. Alfred, NY
- 2009 Guldagergaard-International Ceramic Research Center. Artist Residency. Skælskør, DENMARK
- 2008 Independence Foundation Arts Fellowship. Philadelphia, PA
- 2006 The Clay Studio, Resident Artist. Philadelphia, PA
- 2005 The University of the Arts. Teaching Artist in Residence. Philadelphia, PA
- 2004 Fulbright ASLA/CIMO Grant. Aalto University (University of Art and Design Helsinki). Helsinki, FINLAND
- 2004 Archie Bray Foundation. Summer Residency. Helena, MT

== Awards, honors and public recognition ==
- 2013 Finalist, Elizabeth R. Raphael Founder's Prize. Society for Contemporary Craft. Pittsburgh, PA
- 2011 Elected into The International Academy of Ceramics. Geneva, SWITZERLAND
- 2011 Professional Development Award: fellowship exhibition funds. Alfred University. Alfred, NY
- 2011 Professional Development Award: teaching/researching Ceramic Design in China. Alfred University. Alfred, NY
- 2009 “5th World Ceramic Biennale 2009 Korea International Competition,” honorable mention. Icheon, KOREA
- 2008 Faculty Development Grant. The University of the Arts. For Denmark research/residency. Philadelphia, PA
- 2008 The 8th International Ceramics Competition, Honorable Mention for Dinnerware in White. Mino, JAPAN
- 2008 Chelsea International Fine Arts Competition. Juror: Manon Slome, Chief Curator Chelsea Museum of Art. NY, NY
- 2008 “NICHE Award,” first-place winner-double finalist, Ceramics: Molded category. Rosen Group. Philadelphia, PA
- 2007 Abington Art Center, Annual Juried Exhibition, Elaine Adler Award for Ceramics. Abington, PA
- 2007 “4th World Ceramic Biennale 2007 Korea International Competition,” honorable mention. Icheon, KOREA
- 2007 American Craft Show Searchlight Artist. American Craft Council. New York, NY
- 2006 Abington Art Center, Annual Juried Exhibition, Honorable Mention. Abington, PA
- 2004 Hunter Douglas Horizon Award, First Place. Museum of Arts and Design. New York, NY
- 2004 Edith Franklin Pottery Scholarship, Toledo Community Foundation, Inc. Toledo, OH
- 2003 Howard Kottler Merit Scholarship, Cranbrook Academy of Art. Bloomfield Hills, MI
- 2002 Merit Award Artist Grant, Cranbrook Academy of Art. Bloomfield Hills, MI
- 2001 Peter J. McCahill Memorial Award in Art Education, The University of the Arts. Philadelphia, PA
- 2000 Hammill & Gillespie, Inc. Award in Ceramics, The University of the Arts. Philadelphia, PA
- 2000 Philadelphia Pottery Supply Award, The University of the Arts. Philadelphia, PA
- 2000 Peters Valley Tuition Scholarships. Edison, NJ
- 1999-00 Viola Foulke Trust Scholarship, The University of the Arts. Philadelphia, PA
- 1996-00 Artist Grant, University of the Arts. Philadelphia, PA
- 1996 Laurel Lodge, Masonic Fraternity Scholarship for College Bound Student. Laurel Springs, NJ
- 1996 Sylvania Arts Commission Scholarship, Art Career College Bound Student. Sylvania, OH
- 1996 Lucas County Educational Service Center Governing Board, Outstanding Artistic Achievement/Academic Excellence
- 1996 Northwestern Ohio Regional Scholastic Art & Writing Exhibition, Honor for Excellence in Visual Arts
- 1996 Ninth District Congressional Art Exhibition, Honorable Mention. Toledo, OH

== Articles ==
- "Setting the Table: Completing the Story". Ceramics Monthly: 38–43. January 2015.
- "Ready to Serve: Heather Mae Erickson". American Craft Magazine. January 20, 2014.
- "Spotlight: Intersections". Ceramics Monthly. February 2014.
- "(My) Parts & (My) Whole". Studio Potter. Winter 2011.
- "Ceramics: A Case Study". Fulbright Center News Magazine Helsinki, FINLAND. 2005.

== Corporate, Public and Private Collections ==
- Archie Bray Foundation Collection. Helena, MT
- Norman & Suzanne Cohn. Cohn Family Trust Collection. Trevose, PA
- Maxine & Stewart Frankel Foundation for the Arts Collection. Bloomfield Hills, MI
- Museum of Art and Design. New York, NY
- Guldagergaard-International Ceramic Research Center. Skælskør, DENMARK
- AZRight Management Consultants, Inc. Southfield, MI
- The Rosenfield Collection, David and Louise Rosenfield. Dallas TX
- Memorial Koyo. Healthcare Facility For the Elderly. 39-1 Obata-Cho, Tajimi City Gifu Pref. JAPAN
- Mizunami Chamber of Commerce. 1034-2 Teramawado-cho Mizunami City Gifu Pref. JAPAN
- The Schein-Joseph International Museum of Ceramic Art. Alfred, NY
- University of Art and Design. Department of Ceramics and Glass Collection. Helsinki, FINLAND
- World Ceramic Exposition Foundation. Icheon, KOREA
- Yohaku. Ceramic Wholesale Company. Display in their gallery. 7-11-4 Kokeizan-cho, tajimi City Gifu Pref. JAPAN
