= Robert C. Turner =

Robert C. Turner may refer to:

- Robert Clemens Turner (1908–1978), American economist, Indiana University (1961–1978) and Council of Economic Advisers (1952–1953)
- Robert Chapman Turner (1913–2005), American potter
