= Lisa Orr =

American potter and teacher of ceramics

Lisa Kay Orr is an American potter and a teacher of ceramics. Orr has work in both public and private collections, and shows her work nationally as well as internationally. Orr's work can be seen in the Fine Arts Museum of San Francisco and in Korea in the collection of the WOCEF.

== Education ==
Orr earned her Bachelor of Fine Arts in 1983 from the University of Texas in Austin. She did post-graduate studies at the Southwest Craft Center in San Antonio and the University of Minnesota in Minneapolis. In addition, she studied with Betty Woodman at the University of Colorado in Boulder in 1989, before earning her Masters of Fine Arts at the New York State College of Ceramics at Alfred University in 1992.

== Studio work ==
Orr works in earthenware clay, using a variety of processes that include using the potter's wheel as well as a ram press and press molds, often using multiple processes to produce one piece. Her work, which includes platters, bowls and plates, are organic in form and functional in purpose.

Orr's work is primarily influenced by Mexican folk pottery and is characterized by the terra sigillata, stamps, slips and sprigs she uses to finish the surface, and by her layers of multi-colored glazes.

Orr believes that studio pottery is artistically significant and as a result and in collaboration with five other artists, co-founded the Art of the Pot studio tour. This is an invitational tour where nationally known potters are invited to show their work along with the collaborators in their studios.

She has been awarded grants including a Fulbright, National Endowment for the Arts and the Mid-America Arts Alliance.

== Public Collections ==
- American Museum of Ceramic Art, Pomona, California
- ArtStream Ceramic Library, Denver, Colorado
- Fine Arts Museums of San Francisco, San Francisco, California
- International Museum of Dinnerware Design, Ann Arbor, Michigan
- Kennedy Museum of Art, Ohio University, Athens, Ohio
- The Rosenfield Collection
- San Angelo Museum of Fine Arts, San Angelo, Texas
- San Antonio Museum of Art, San Antonio, Texas
- Schein-Joseph International Museum of Ceramic Arts, Alfred University, Alfred, New York
- South Texas Institute for the Arts, Corpus Christi, Texas
- Yeoju World Ceramic Livingware Gallery, Icheon, South Korea

== Publications ==
- Orr, Lisa. "Studio Visit." Ceramics Monthly (September 2011).
- _______. "Backwards into the Future: Technology and Sustainability." The Studio Potter (2008).
- _______. "Synaesthesia: A Potter's Experience and Research." The Studio Potter (2006).
- _______. "A Macedonian Pottery Village." The Studio Potter (Spring 1998).
