= Annabeth Rosen =

American artist (born 1957)

- Born: 1957 (age 68–69); Brooklyn, New York, U.S.
- Education: Cranbrook Academy of Art, New York State College of Ceramics at Alfred University
- Known for: Sculpture, ceramics, drawing
- Awards: Guggenheim Fellowship, American Academy of Arts and Letters, National Endowment for the Arts, American Craft Council
- Website: Annabeth Rosen

Annabeth Rosen (born 1957) is an American sculptor best known for abstract ceramic works, as well as drawings. She is considered part of a second generation of Bay Area ceramic artists after the California Clay Movement, who have challenged ceramic traditions involving expression, form and function and helped spur the medium's acceptance in mainstream contemporary sculpture. Rosen's sculptures range from monumental to tabletop-sized, and emerge out of an accumulative bricolage process combining dozens or hundreds of fabricated parts and clay fragments and discards. Reviewers characterize her art as deliberately raw, both muscular and unapologetic feminine, and highly abstract yet widely referential in its suggestions of humanoid, botanical, aquatic, artificial, even science-fictional qualities. Critic Kay Whitney wrote that her work is "visceral in its impact, violent even, but also sensual and evocative" and "floats between the poles of the comic and the mordant."

Rosen has exhibited at venues including the Los Angeles County Museum of Art (LACMA), Contemporary Arts Museum Houston, Virginia Museum of Fine Arts, Kyoto Municipal Museum of Art, and Yingge Ceramics Museum (Taipei). Her work belongs to the public collections of LACMA, the Museum of Fine Arts Boston, Philadelphia Museum of Art, and Virginia Museum of Fine Arts, among others. She has received a Guggenheim Fellowship, Pew Artists fellowship, Joan Mitchell Artists Award, and United States Artists award. Rosen is a professor of art at University of California, Davis.

Annabeth Rosen, Squill, fired ceramic, steel bailing wire and steel plate, 30" x 28" x 28", 2006–2007

== Early life and career ==
Rosen was born and raised in Brooklyn, New York. She received a traditional education in ceramics at New York State College of Ceramics at Alfred University (BFA, 1978), before enrolling in graduate studies at the Cranbrook Academy of Art (MFA, 1981). She began a teaching career in 1985, serving at institutions including the School of the Art Institute of Chicago, Rhode Island School of Design, Tyler School of Art and Architecture, University of the Arts, and Bennington College. In 1997, she moved from the east coast to Davis, California to accept a position as the Robert Arneson Endowed Chair at the University of California, Davis.

Rosen has been recognized through inclusion in several major ceramics surveys, including "The American Way" (Aberystwyth Arts Centre, 1993, traveling), "Color and Fire: Defining Moments In Contemporary Ceramics," (LACMA, 2000), "American Ceramics 1950-1990" (Kyoto Museum of Art, 2002), "Bay Area Ceramic Sculptors: Second Generation" (Daum Museum, 2004), "Overthrown: Clay Without Limits" (Denver Art Museum, 2010), and "New Blue and White" (Museum of Fine Arts Boston, 2013). She has received wider attention in her later career, most notably through a twenty-year survey including more than 120 sculptures and works on paper created over two decades, "Fired, Broken, Gathered, Heaped" (2017–9), that was mounted at the Contemporary Arts Museum Houston, Cranbrook Art Museum, and Contemporary Jewish Museum in San Francisco.

== Work and reception ==
Annabeth Rosen, "Waver" exhibition image, Contemporary Arts Museum Houston, 2018

Critics have described Rosen's work as conceptually complex, combining feminist concerns, humble materials and craft, decoration, labor-intensive processes, and a highly formal rigor. They suggest that her idiosyncratic approach is both grounded in traditional ceramics training and knowledge and dedicated to challenging the norms of the medium. Her work demonstrates the versatile and art-historical character of clay, recalling the Funk humor of Robert Arneson, the expressionism and scale of Peter Voulkos, and work by other ceramic innovators such as Viola Frey, Ken Price and Betty Woodman. Writers place equal weight on Rosen's postminimalist merging of formalism with emotion and intuitive gesture, which links her to sculptors Eva Hesse, Jackie Winsor, Yayoi Kusama and Lynda Benglis, among others.

Rosen's sculpture generally combines precariously balanced and structurally dense forms, packed gestural surfaces, and expressively applied glazes. Critics often note its disruption and displacement of perception, with shifts between detail and whole and micro- and macro-scales, which convey the psychological and symbolic through tactile qualities and figurative or architectural senses through physical presence. She constructs her sculptures using a hands-on, accumulative process analogous to growth patterns that—atypically for ceramics—includes openness to chance, accident, technical "disasters" and ongoing experimentation; the process includes glazing, firing, wrapping or binding shards (with wire or elastic bands), re-firing and re-glazing, and combining wet and fired clay, among methods.

Drawing also represents an important part of Rosen's practice. Her immersive, mostly ink, gouache and acrylic works often consist of entire surfaces covered with repeated, wave-like gestural marks. Like her clay pieces, they emphasize painterly gesture, accumulation, immediacy, and conceptual and formal experimentation, and according to Art in America critic Glenn Adamson, attest to the "importance of furious, iterative mark-making to her practice."

Annabeth Rosen, Sample, fired and glazed ceramics on steel stand, 28" x 108" x 80", 1999

=== Earlier work ===
Rosen's work in the first half of her career reflected her traditional ceramics training and—particularly after the move to California—an interest in nature. It ranged from tall ceramic outdoor sculptures to slashing geometric black-ink drawings to thick, plate- and tile-based slabs that sprouted dense, vertical accumulations of modeled organic forms. In the latter works, critics noted affinities with historical architectural ornamentation—della Robbia's terra-cotta plaques, decorative aspects of Gaudi and Louis Sullivan, or the swarming statuary of Hindu temples—as well as with geological cross-sections. Sample (1999) is a representative piece, consisting of a roughly 10' by 16' grid of squares, dense with squirming, tentacular forms stacked in two layers and elevated on a steel stand. Maria Porges deemed the yellow-glazed work "a baroque, feminist-inflected riposte to Carl Andre's dour modular floor pieces: nature's fecundity riffing on the sometimes-humorless dryness of Minimalism."

Rosen's show "Moving in Place" (2003) featured abstract, squatty agglomerations of forms suggesting emergent seedpods, gourds, fruit and human organs with surfaces of chalky white slip fired over deep-colored glazes (e.g., Chromus, 2000). Reviews compared the works' ghostliness to the white-powdered faces of classical Chinese theater, African face painting, or the aftermath of an unknown disaster. Writing about the stalky, bulbous work Cinctus I (2003), Ken Johnson likened it to an "ancient mold of spooky, moonlit antiquity [whose] weighty, slightly menacing muscularity" offered an exciting alternative to the typical refinement of ceramics.

=== "Mash-ups," "Bundled constructions" and "Mound" sculptures ===
Annabeth Rosen, Wave II, fired and glazed ceramic wired to steel armature, 71" X 60" x 28", 2017. Shown with Sol LeWitt wall painting (background), Cranbrook Art Museum, 2018.

In the mid-2000s, Rosen turned to more loosely composed pieces she called "mash-ups" and "bundled constructions," which ranged from pedestal- (e.g., Squill, 2006–7) to human-sized. Reviewers noted the wide range of natural and cultural associations the sculptures conjured—scholars rocks and garden gnomes, barnacles proliferating on rocks, beehives, alien plants or ritual objects. The larger works typically consisted of numerous, individually modeled biomorphic elements, piled and bound together with wire or rubber strips and seemingly about to topple, which were held upright by tall metal armatures resting on casters, like wheel carts. Their rounded, globular forms—alternately wormlike, bulbous, knobby, vegetal or organ-like—were often glazed in vivid shades of green and yellow, and in some cases intertwined with black and white tubular shapes in notably asymmetrical assemblages.

Kenneth Baker wrote that pieces such as Bunny (2011)—a dense cluster of writhing forms capped by a tuberous yellow figure—exhibited "a pitch of comic grotesquerie" making them appropriate "emblems of a culture in which voiceless instinct expresses itself as excess—of accumulation, consumption, impulsiveness or power." In 2014, David Cohen characterized such works as "monumentally goofy tours de force of constructional complexity and formal singularity [with] sculptural personae that are as defiantly present as they are elusive or ambivalent to characterize." He and others likened their surprisingly animated human qualities, alternately, to Medusa, absurd Philip Guston works come to life, writhing souls in a scene from Dante, and "the sinewy contortions" of the Mannerist sculptor Giambologna.

In the latter 2010s, Rosen began producing mound-like works resembling tilting haystacks, rocky cliffs or melting snowmen. These included smaller pieces such as Boogaloo (2015)—a fired manganese purple and white ceramic mass with cracked glaze and a primordial look—and enormous works like Wave II (2017), an undulating white-and-black striped mass of bulbs and tubes that "reclined" on a steel armature and evoked both water in motion and a posed odalisque. Rosen's exhibition, "Tie Me to the Mast" (P.P.O.W., 2017), included Bank and Parcel (2011–8), two six-foot-high towers composed of tubes, gourds, balls and blobs wired and piled on a wheeled dolly that Art in America called "hilarious in their pendulous anthropomorphism."

== Awards and public collections ==
Rosen has been awarded fellowships from the Pew Center (1992), United States Artists (2016), and John S. Guggenheim Foundation (2018). She has received awards from the National Endowment for the Arts (1979, 1986), Pennsylvania Council on the Arts (1988), Joan Mitchell Foundation (2011) and American Academy of Arts and Letters (2018), and was elected into the American Craft Council College of Fellows in 2020. She has been awarded artist residencies from The Fabric Workshop and Museum, Bemis Center for Contemporary Arts, Watershed Center for the Ceramic Arts, and University of the Arts (Philadelphia).

Rosen's work belongs to the public collections of the Los Angeles County Museum of Art, Philadelphia Museum of Art, Crocker Art Museum, Daum Museum of Contemporary Art, Denver Art Museum, Everson Museum of Art, Fine Arts Museums of San Francisco, Museum of Fine Arts Boston, Oakland Museum of California, and Virginia Museum of Fine Arts, among others.
