= Viola Frey =

American artist (1933–2004)

- Viola Frey with her sculptures, photo by M. Lee Fatherree
- Born: August 15, 1933; Lodi, California
- Died: July 26, 2004 (aged 70); Oakland, California
- Known for: Sculpture, painting, and drawing

Viola Frey (August 15, 1933 – July 26, 2004) was an American artist working in sculpture, painting and drawing, and professor emerita at California College of the Arts. She lived and worked in the San Francisco Bay Area and was renowned for her larger-than-life, colorfully glazed clay sculptures of men and women, which expanded the traditional boundaries of ceramic sculpture.

== Early life and education ==
Born in 1933, Viola Frey grew up on her family's vineyard in Lodi, California.

She received a BFA in 1956 from California College of Arts and Crafts (now California College of the Arts), where she studied painting with Richard Diebenkorn and ceramics with Vernon "Corky" Coykendall and Charles Fiske. Her fellow students included Robert Arneson, Manuel Neri and Nathan Oliveira. After receiving her bachelor's degree, she attended graduate school at Tulane University and studied with Mark Rothko and George Rickey. She left Tulane in 1957 without receiving her master's degree and moved to New York to work with ceramicist Katherine Choy at the Clay Art Center in Port Chester, New York.

The Clay Art Center was one of the earliest venues on the East Coast geared toward artists exploring ceramics as a fine art medium without the functional constraints of craft.

== Career ==
Frey returned to the San Francisco Bay Area in 1960 where she became an internationally respected artist and a leading figure in contemporary ceramics. She was well known for her monumental, brightly colored ceramic sculptures, which explored issues of gender, cultural iconography and art history. Along with Robert Arneson and Peter Voulkos, Frey reshaped and defined the use of ceramics as a fine art medium through her robust sculptures.

"Frey was one of a number of California artists working in clay in the 1950s and 60s who turned away from that medium's conventions to produce works with robust sculptural qualities associated with Abstract Expressionist painting, Pop art and what would come to be known as California Funk."

"Viola has had a profound impact on the visual arts. She was able to take the culture surrounding her and reform those elements into a totally original form of sculpture that defined one of the great contributions to modern art," commented Michael S. Roth, former President of the California College of the Arts.

In the 1970s, after moving to a larger studio in Oakland, Frey started creating her signature larger-than-life ceramic figures. Standing up to twelve feet high and constructed of separate pieces, the massive men appear in generic suits and ties, while the large female figures are often depicted in heavily patterned, 1950s-style dresses.

In 1979, Viola was included in "A Century of Ceramics in the United States 1878-1978", which Garth Clark co-organized with Margie Hughto for the Everson Museum of Art. In 1981, the Minneapolis Institute of Art acquired Double Grandmother. This led to her solo exhibition at the Whitney Museum of American Art in 1984, curated by Patterson Sims.

As expressed in an essay by art critic Donald Kuspit, "Frey has certainly tested—aggressively stretched—the limits of freestanding sculpture in her giant, brash, richly colored figures, but her plate pieces—essentially pictorial reliefs—are more subdued, indeed much more introverted." Frey's tondo plates, ranging in size from 26 inches to 36 inches in diameter, are described by Kuspit as "a remarkable, innovative, contribution to ceramic sculpture, for she shows that it can be formally exciting as well as iconographically trenchant without losing its intimate touch..."

Frey was an avid collector of ceramic figurines and other knick-knacks found in flea markets, and her vast collection of tchotchkes inspired a body of her ceramic works, which she called bricolage sculptures, based on the term used by the French anthropologist Claude Lévi-Strauss in his book The Savage Mind. As explained by Garth Clark in his essay for Frey's 1981 retrospective exhibition, bricolage translates from French as "an object made by the bricoleur, a junk man or handy man... The bricoleur picks up odds and ends from his time... and makes unique projects out of unknown things."

Identifying with Lévi-Strauss's description of the bricoleur, Frey made molds and slipcasts of her flea market findings to create unique ceramic assemblage works composed of a cornucopia of cascading figures and objects.

Although most renowned for her ceramic sculptures, Frey also created a significant body of two-dimensional works that have been widely exhibited. Her paintings and pastel drawings reflect her love of the human figure, her colorful palette, and iconography similar to that used in her sculptures.

Frey lived surrounded by art and a collection of approximately 4,000 art books. Committed to her art, she continued working almost until the end of her life. She died in Oakland, California, in 2004.

== Teaching career ==
Frey joined the faculty at the California College of Arts and Crafts in 1965, and continued a relationship with the college through 1999 as full professor and chair of the Ceramics Program. During her tenure, Frey guided the design of the Noni Eccles Treadwell Ceramic Arts Center on the college's Oakland campus. She was awarded the status of professor emerita in 1999, and the college established the Viola Frey Chair in Fine Arts in 2003.

== Iconography ==
Viola Frey's oeuvre is rich in iconography which she used to represent autobiographical, cultural and art history markers. Viola Frey collected mass-produced figurines at local California flea markets, the images of which she used repeatedly in her career. These figurines were often re-cast in clay slip for use in her bricolage and sculpture. Common figurines found throughout her artwork are the rooster, Venus de Milo, The Three Graces, Grecian urns, Wedgwood pottery, Asian figurines, articulated male and female toys, and a menagerie of animals. She also invented a family of unique stylized figures for her large-scale sculpture, paintings and pastels. These include men-in-suits, grandmothers, self-portraits and nude figures taken directly from life drawing sessions.

== Recognition ==
The recipient of two National Endowment for the Arts fellowships and an American Craft Council fellow, Frey was also presented with the Award of Honor in Sculpture from the San Francisco Arts Commission. She was also awarded an honorary doctorate in fine art from the California College of Arts and Crafts, Oakland. Her work, Untitled V Family (Humpty Dumpty), was acquired by the Smithsonian American Art Museum as part of the Renwick Gallery's 50th Anniversary Campaign.

== Legacy ==
Near the end of her life, Frey partnered with artist Squeak Carnwath and her husband, Gary Knecht, to establish the Artists' Legacy Foundation. After her death in 2004, the foundation received her artwork, archives and reference materials, and funds to support the stewardship of her legacy. The Artists' Legacy Foundation also supports living artists through educational programs and the Artist Award.

Frey's life, work, and historical context has been more deeply explored in the publication Viola Frey: Artist's Mind/Studio/World, published in 2024. In a review of the book, art critic Sarah Hotchkiss explained its premise: "How do interior and exterior forces shape a life’s work — and what kind of thrilling slippage can take place between the mind, studio and world?"
