= Margaret Boozer =

American ceramist and sculpture artist

- Eight Red Bowls, Maryland terra cotta and pine, Margaret Boozer, 1966, Smithsonian American Art Museum
- Born: 1966 (age 59–60); Anniston, Alabama, United States
- Education: Auburn University (BFA, 1989); New York State College of Ceramics (MFA, 1992)
- Known for: Ceramic sculpture
- Notable work: Eight Red Bowls; Bandar Dirt Poem; From This Distance
- Movement: Folk art
- Website: margaretboozer.com

Margaret A Boozer (born 1966) is an American ceramist and sculpture artist, best known for her clay and ceramic compositions, or landscapes, that focus on the individuality, history, and geology of the clay used as subject matters.

== Education ==
Boozer received her training and education at Auburn University, where she graduated with a BFA in 1989, and later earned a MFA from New York State College of Ceramics in 1992.

== Career ==
Boozer is the founder and director of the Red Dirt Studio, a group art studio in Mount Rainier, Maryland, where she teaches advanced workshops in ceramics and sculpture that help students transition toward becoming professionals with their own studios. Prior to founding the Red Dirt Studio, she taught for ten years at the Corcoran College of Art and Design. She also is a visiting artist and lecturer at the Freer Gallery of Art, Auburn University, Renwick Gallery, Gallaudet University, George Washington University, and the Virginia Commonwealth University.

Boozer was a member of the Washington Sculptors Group Board of Directors Membership Committee.

== Work and collections ==
Boozer's work is included in the collection of the Renwick Gallery of the Smithsonian American Art Museum, New York's South Street Seaport Museum, the US Department of State, the Washington DC City Hall Art Collection at the John A. Wilson Building, and in other various private collections. Boozer also creates work that is more readily consumable for commercial art galleries, often consisting of highly decorative abstract wall-mounted pieces in the form of cracked, heat-blasted rectangular slabs.

In 2009, her work was on view at the American University Museum at the Katzen Arts Center and may have qualified as the biggest mud pie in the world to be found in a museum. The work, Dirt Drawings, was to provide an opportunity for visitors to have the same experience she does every morning at her studio, and consisted of a floor installation that included crumbling clay that formed crater-like platters of ringed clay.

In 2011, her work From This Distance, a clay and steel sculpture that results in a galactic array of clusters of speckled and distressed porcelain disks, was commissioned for installation as part of a permanent exhibition at the Djibouti US Embassy for the US State Department.

Also in 2011, her work Line Drawing, a site-specific installation, was temporarily exhibited at the Flashpoint Gallery in Washington, DC. For this exhibit, Boozer used samples of excavated sedimentary rock and soil found at the nearby construction site of CityCenterDC, to recreate a geologically accurate linear progression of the earth below the gallery and city, by laying stratum after stratum in a narrow lengthwise band down the centre of the gallery floor. The history and geology of the earth is often a theme in some of Boozer's work, drawing inspiration from the raw soil and clay materials to present an abstract vision of an often overlooked story. In this approach, her 2012 work Correlation Drawing / Drawing Correlations: A Five Borough Reconnaissance Soil Survey showcases the aesthetics of urban soil while presenting a mapped history of the soil beneath New York City. The piece, the result of a cooperation with Dr. Richard K. Shaw, soil scientist for the Natural Resources Conservation Service who led the New York City Reconnaissance Soil Survey, was originally exhibited at the Museum of Art and Design; the piece was afterwards acquired by the Museum of the City of New York for permanent exhibition as the South Street Seaport Museum, and it consists of a grid of translucent plexiglas boxes that contain soil samples from all five New York boroughs surveyed over a span of 15 years.
