= Norm Schulman =

American ceramic artist (1924–2014)

Norm Schulman (October 27, 1924 – October 4, 2014) was an American ceramic artist who lived in Penland, North Carolina. He was born in New York City in 1924. He operated his own studio, Norman Schulman Studio, in Penland.

== Education ==
He earned his Bachelor of Science in Art from Parsons School of Design, New York in 1950. He then received his BS/Art from School of Education, New York University, New York in 1951. He received his Master of Fine Arts (MFA) in Ceramic Design from New York State College of Ceramics at Alfred University, with a New York Teaching & Research Fellowship, in 1958.

== Professional career ==
Beginning in 1951 he was a Packaging & Materials Handling Engineer, Wright Aero Division of Curtis-Wright Corporation, Woodbridge, New Jersey and in 1954 he became Supervisor of Packaging Engineering, until 1956.

In 1958 he became Instructor of Ceramics, Toledo Museum of Art, Toledo, Ohio, until 1965 when he became Professor, Head of Ceramics & Glass, Rhode Island School of Design, Providence, Rhode Island -: Visiting Artist, Fall Semester, New York State College of Ceramics, Alfred, New York -: Visiting Artist, Spring Semester, University of Iowa, Iowa City, Iowa. This lasted until 1976.

In 1978 he founded Norman Schulman Studio, Penland, North Carolina. from 1982 until 1974 he was Head of Ceramics, Ohio State University, Columbus, Ohio. He then returned to working at his own studio until his death.

== Work ==
Schulman used both intuition and inspiration. Some of his pieces reflect his social environment while others are purely his artistic reaction to the medium his visual awareness of design. He took keen pleasure in the material he uses as well as the process, both in the making and in the firing. He used a variety of techniques and material.

Schulman refers to his work from the 1980-1990's as "searching for poetry rather than descriptive and narrative". Schulman commented about his recent work that "I wanted to start all over again and get back to the essence. I've been working [with clay] for 50 years, and I've been constantly changing and developing, making one series after another. But I've always wanted to do what I'm doing right now...taking care of my own creative needs."

Schulman produces a range of work in ceramics. Some of his pieces are strictly functional while others are sculptural. He is more popularly known for creating complex double-walled vessels, salt-glazed porcelain pieces as well as sculpted three-dimensional paintings. He has worked and experimented with a series of work called "Arlecchino," or Harlequin works. He considered these works part of a series that acknowledges fantasies and daydreams.

== A Life in Clay ==
A Life in Clay was a retrospective traveling exhibit that featured the work of Schulman during his long career as a ceramic artist. The exhibit was shown at the Schein-Joseph International Museum of Ceramics Art, Alfred, New York and The Asheville Museum of Art, Asheville, North Carolina. Schulman is an important and well-respected ceramic artist, teacher and mentor. His influence spans several generations of potters in both North Carolina and around the world. His work and his willingness to mentor young ceramic students is the reason he is viewed as a highly regarded artist to both his peers and former students. His studio is located in Penland, North Carolina, near the prestigious Penland School of Crafts.

=== Living Treasure ===
In 2007, Schulman was the first person to be named a Penland School of Crafts Outstanding Artist Educator and was then Schulman was awarded the North Carolina Living Treasure Award in 2009 for his contributions to his field in ceramics. His work is in the collections of the Smithsonian American Art Museum, Museum of Art and Design, and the Mint Museum of Craft & Design.

== Personal life ==
Norm Schulman lived with his wife Gloria Schulman in Penland, North Carolina.
