= Kristen Morgin =

American sculptor

Kristen L. Morgin (born 1968) is an American visual artist working primarily in sculpture. She is best known for her works made of unfired clay that use trompe-l'œil to appear as wood, paper, or metal and suggest decay.

== Biography ==
Kristen Morgin was born in Brunswick, Georgia and currently lives and works in Los Angeles, California. Morgin received her Bachelor of Arts from California State University, Hayward in 1993 and her Master of Fine Arts in Ceramics from New York State College of Ceramics at Alfred University in 1997. She has taught ceramics at California State University, Long Beach and was Dodd Visiting professor at the University of Georgia for 2011–2012.

Morgin is represented by Marc Selwyn Fine Art in Los Angeles and Zach Feuer Gallery in New York.

== Exhibits and collections ==
Morgin's works have been shown at the Hammer Museum, the University of Colorado Boulder, the 3rd World Ceramic Biennale in Icheon, South Korea, and the 2007 inaugural show of the New Museum's new location. Several of these works are in the collections of the San Francisco Museum of Modern Art and the Hammer Museum. In 2016, she was included in the biannual Renwick Invitational in Washington, DC.

== Awards ==
Morgin received the Joan Mitchell Award in 2005.
