= Ruth Gowdy McKinley =

Canadian ceramic artist (1931-1981)

- Born: Reena Ruth Gowdy; June 14, 1931; Brooklyn, New York
- Died: March 29, 1981 (aged 49); Mississauga, Ontario
- Education: B.F.A. New York State College of Ceramics, Alfred University, Alfred, NY; M.F.A. Alfred
- Known for: Functional Ceramicist
- Spouse: Donald Lloyd McKinley
- Awards: first potter elected to the Royal Canadian Academy of Arts (1976)

Ruth Gowdy McKinley RCA (June 14, 1931 – March 29, 1981) was an American-born Canadian ceramic artist noted for her skill in designing functional ceramic ware. She specialized in making teapots, cups and vases and was known for her attention to function and form.

== Early life ==
Born in Brooklyn, New York, McKinley originally studied classical piano from the age of four and eventually was offered admission to study at the Juilliard School of Music in New York City. McKinley then made the decision to work with pottery by enrolling, instead, to study in the Department of Industrial Design at the New York State College of Ceramics in Alfred. McKinley earned her BFA and MFA from Alfred University, the MFA in 1955. She emigrated to Canada with her husband Donald in 1967 (he headed the furniture program at the new Sheridan College School of Craft and Design in Mississauga).

== Career ==
In 1967, she became the resident Potter at Sheridan College of Art and Design in Mississauga, Ontario. In 1973, she made her exhibition debut at the Ceramics International 1973 at the University of Calgary and won the Metal award. In 1976, she became the first potter elected into the Royal Canadian Academy of Art. In 1997, her retrospective was held at the Burlington Art Centre. Her work is included in the collections of the Musée national des beaux-arts du Québec, the Art Gallery of Burlington, the Canadian Clay and Glass Gallery, the Gardiner Museum, Toronto; and the Canadian Museum of Civilization, Gatineau, Quebec.

The Ruth Gowdy McKinley project records are in Archives Ontario.

== Legacy ==
In 1993, in honour of Ruth Gowdy McKinley, the Canadian Clay and Glass Gallery opened in Waterloo, Ontario, largely due to the efforts of Gowdy McKinley’s friends and colleagues who wished to honour her memory.
