= Karon Doherty =

American ceramic sculptor

Karon Doherty, née Richardson (1941–1999) was a ceramic sculptor. She was influenced by the colors and themes of folk art, but was academically trained. Her work incorporated imagery relating to people and animals from her personal life, including her husband, Louis, and her pet dogs, cats and birds. She worked with a wide variety of forms, from teapots to very large shrines, and used bright, earthenware colors and terra cotta clay bodies. The use of color was critical to her artistic expression.

About her installation, The Last Garden Party, Doherty said, " It's important to capture the emotional quality of my life in this work."

Doherty received a BFA from the Kansas City Art Institute in 1977 and an MFA from the New York State College of Ceramics at Alfred, New York in 1981. In 1988 she began teaching in the ceramics department at the University of Massachusetts, Dartmouth.

Doherty was one of the founders of the New Bedford Art Museum. She was elected as a Fellow in the National Council on Education for the Ceramic Arts (NCECA) in 1997.

Karon Doherty was born in Tacoma, Washington. She was married to Louis Doherty, with whom she collaborated on some multi media works. She died June 11, 1999, of heart failure.

Doherty's work is included in the collection of the Fine Arts Museums of San Francisco: https://art.famsf.org/karen-doherty/teapot-20041441
