= Steve Heinemann =

Canadian artist working in ceramics (born 1957)

Steve Heinemann (born 1957) is a Canadian artist working in ceramics.

Born in Toronto, Ontario, Heinemann received an Honours diploma from Sheridan College School of Craft and Design, Oakville, Ontario in 1979, a B.F.A. from the Kansas City Art Institute, Kansas City, Missouri in 1984, and an M.F.A. from the New York State College of Ceramics at Alfred University, Alfred, New York.

== Body of work ==
His ceramic work has evolved from his interest in pottery. It is grounded in the idea of pottery as having an inner space that is the focus for imagination. Heinemann's self described element of his work is "..., the fundamental, preoccupying thread of containment continues throughout. I’m intrigued with the way spaces can appear to be concentrated. God knows that it’s the same space everywhere - inside or outside - but there’s something about the dynamic of containment that seems to charge one’s attention. Pots have always done that for me. One is held in that interior space perceptually."

In 2017 he had a major retrospective at the Gardiner Museum in Toronto.

== Academic career ==
He has worked as an instructor at Sheridan College, in Mississauga, Ontario, and the Ontario College of Art and Design, in Toronto, Ontario, and has given workshops and lectures in ceramics at schools and universities in Canada, the United States, England, Japan, and Korea.

- New York State College of Ceramics at Alfred University, Alfred, New York, 1973–present
- Rhode Island School of Design, Providence, Rhode Island, 1970–73
- University of Nebraska at Omaha, 1968–1970

== Awards ==
Heinemann has been the recipient of a number of awards for his ceramic work including,

- Special Award, 2nd Word Ceramic Biennale, Korea (2003)
- Canada Council 'A' Grant
- Saidye Bronfman Award for Excellence in Canadian Craft, 1996
- Judge's Commendation, Fletcher Challenge International, Auckland, New Zealand (1996)
- Judge's Award, The 4th Ceramic International, Mino, Japan (1995)
- Award of Merit, Fletcher Challenge International, New Zealand (1995)
- Le Prix d'Excellence, National Biennial of Ceramics, Trois-Rivieres, Quebec (1994)
- Award of Merit, Fletcher Challenge International, New Zealand (1994)
- Bronze Medal, International Ceramic Invitational, Taipei (1993)
- Le Prix d'Excellence, National Biennial of Ceramics (1988)
- Prix Pierre Legros, National Biennial of Ceramics (1984)

== Selected solo exhibitions ==
- David Kaye Gallery, Toronto Canada (2017)
- Galerie b 15, Munich, Germany (2004)
- Nancy Margolis Gallery, New York City, NY (2004)
- Galerie Elena Lee, Montreal, Quebec, Canada (2003)
- Ute Stebich Gallery, Lenox, MA (2002)
- Nancy Margolis Gallery, New York City, NY (2002)
- Gallery Materia, Phoenix (2001)
- Galerie Elena Lee, Montreal(1999, 2000)
- Selected Works, 1989–1999, York Quay Gallery II, Harbourfront Centre, Toronto (2000)
- Nancy Margolis Gallery, New York City, NY (1999)
- Prime Gallery, Toronto, Ontario (1995, 1999)
- Objects of Sight, Traveling exhibition organized by Burlington, Cultural Centre, Burlington, Ontario (1989–1991)
- Hopkins Hall Gallery, Ohio State University, Columbus, OH (1986)
- Anna Leonowens Gallery, Nova Scotia College of Art and Design, Halifax, NS (1984)
- Ontario Crafts Council, Toronto, Ontario (1982)

== Selected public and private collections ==
The works of Heinemann are displayed in a number of collections including;

- American Craft Museum (now The Museum of Arts & Design), New York City, NY
- Art Gallery of Nova Scotia, Halifax, Nova Scotia
- Auckland Museum, Auckland, New Zealand
- Canada Council Art Bank, Ottawa, Ontario
- Canadian Museum of Civilization, Ottawa, Ontario, Canada
- Frank Steyaert Museum, Ghent, Belgium
- Gardiner Museum of Ceramic Art, Toronto, Ontario
- Hong Ik University, Seoul, South Korea
- Montreal Museum of Fine Arts, Montreal, Quebec
- Museum of Fine Arts, Boston, Massachusetts
- Museum Het Kruithuis, 's-Hertogenbosch, The Netherlands
- National Museum of History, Taipei, Taiwan
- Ontario Crafts Council, Toronto, Ontario
- Taipei County Yinkgo Ceramics Museum, Taipei
- UBS Bank, Toronto
- Victoria and Albert Museum, London, UK
- Winnipeg Art Gallery, Winnipeg, Manitoba
- World Ceramic Center, Korea
