= Julia Galloway =

American artist (born 1966)

Julia Galloway (born 1966) is a Montana-based studio potter and professor of ceramics at the University of Montana-Missoula.

== Early life and education ==
Julia Galloway was raised in Boston, Massachusetts and started throwing pots in high school, buying her first wheel with babysitting money. She kept her wheel in her bedroom and carried her pots to school in a shoe box to be fired. She obtained MFA at the University of Colorado at Boulder and BFA at the New York State College of Ceramics at Alfred University.

== Work description ==
Most of her objects are made by combining wheel-thrown and hand-built elements "to expose the sculptural nature of pottery, and the seductive nature of porcelain". She primarily fires her objects in a kiln, for its skin surface qualities and allowing for layering of decoration.

Her work typically ranges between 4-20 inches in length and 6–18 in height. Their forms are somewhat "exaggerated, their surface bold, colorful, complex, and often, challenging".

Many of her pieces have an erotic theme with their folds, curves, and bulges, and touch is reemphasized and reinforced by lush, juicy, drippy and wet glazes.

Early in her career, she was recognized for making pottery that carries a sense of lyricism and engenders joyous and pleasurable experiences in their use.

Galloway's work is intended to be functional, yet also beautiful. To Galloway, beauty is as valid as function, and she looks for making pottery that is "joyous to use and decorates" living spaces with "character and elegance". The objects are meant to be appreciated both through vision and touch. While they initially appear to be simple and familiar, they are noted by other artists to be very complex.

Most notable about Galloway's forms has been her nesting of vessels within baskets and trays. Joining forms together, she presents them as pairs, groups or stacks. Her pairs are mirrors of each other or nestling bedmates. Her cream and sugar "beds", reference the domestic. Some of her creamers rest on pillowy mattresses, while others stand tall on top of smaller partners. The trays and baskets are slab-constructed with raw grogged stoneware, whereas they contain colorful porcellaneous stonewares, thus having containers within containers and not bases or sconces.

Influenced by Minoan ceramics, Sung and Tang dynasty court ware, as well as Persian miniature paintings, her work references human form and domestic architecture with form, and recalls floral patterning and organic decoration.

== Exhibitions and collections ==
Julia Galloway work has been published in Ceramics Monthly, Studio Potter, Art and Perception and Clay Times. She also features in "The Ceramic Spectrum" by Robin Hopper, "The Art of Contemporary Pottery" by Kevin Hulch, Craft in America: Celebrating Two Centuries of Artist and Objects, and The Ceramic Continuum, Archie Bray Foundation. Julia's work is included in the collections of the Renwick Gallery, Smithsonian Museum, Washington DC, The Huntington Museum of Art, Huntington, WV, Archie Bray Foundation, Helena, MT, The Clay Art Center, Port Chester, NY, The Art Gallery of Nova Scotia, Halifax, Nova Scotia, Canada, and the University of Arkansas, Fayetteville.

== Endangered species project ==
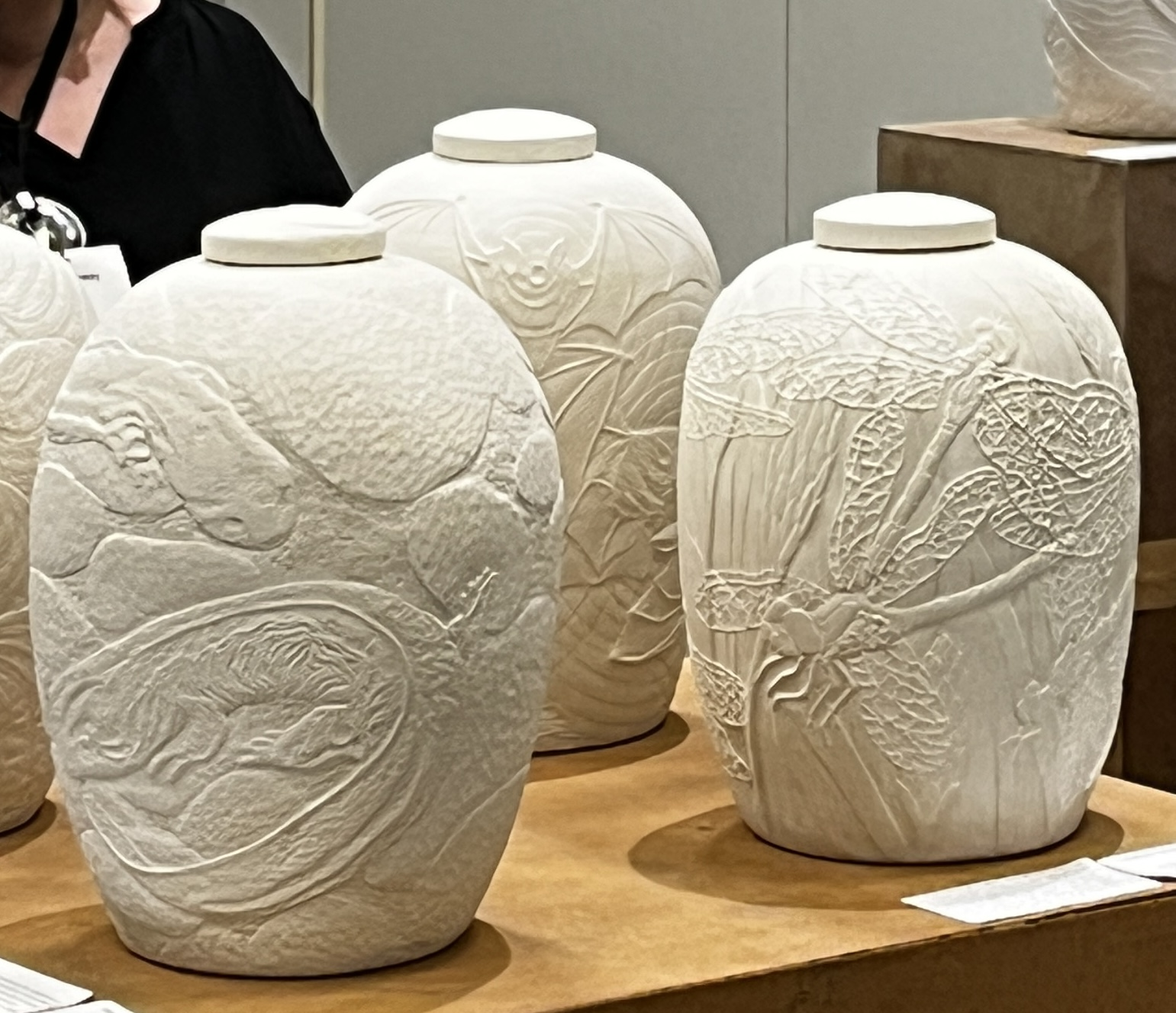
Julia Galloway's carved urns featuring Endangered Species

In 2017, upon hearing a story of albatross getting caught and killed in fishing lines, Galloway began featuring endangered, threatened, and extinct species on her pottery, buy creating over 1000 urns. They are technically functional but they are not made for actual use; they are metaphorical. This project is concept driven, political and personal.

== Community engagement and service ==
Julia Galloway is renowned for her call for education and promotion of a medium.

- National Council for the Education of Ceramic Arts (NCECA), 2017-2020, Director at Large
- Archie Bray Foundation for the Ceramic Arts, 2010–present Board of Directors, Helena, MT
- Montana Clay –serves to gather information about ceramics in Montana.

== Awards and honors ==
- 2023 Ceramics Monthly, Artist of the Year
- 2023 NCECA, Fellow of the Council
- 2018 United States Artist, $50,000 Unrestricted Fellowship
