= Betty Baugh =

- Born: 1929; San Antonio, Texas, U.S.
- Died: 2022 (aged 92–93); San Francisco, CA
- Occupation: Industrial designer
- Children: 4

Betty Baugh (1938–2022) was an American industrial designer, educator, and former president of the Industrial Designers Society of America (IDSA).

== Early life and education ==
Baugh was raised in San Antonio, Texas. She attended Stephens College in Columbia, Missouri, before transferring to the New York State College of Ceramics at Alfred University in Alfred, New York, where she graduated cum laude in 1953.

== Career ==
Baugh designed for companies including Libbey Glass, L.E. Smith Glass and Grainware, Villeroy & Boch, Wilton Armetale, USG, Anchor Hocking, Madeline Originals, Nambé International (subsidiary of Portmeirion Pottery), Progressive International (acquired by Evriholder), and Viking Glass Company. Baugh operated her own business, Betty Baugh Designs, for over 40 years and she taught at the City College of San Francisco from 2006 to 2010.

Baugh's work was included in the 2002 Toledo Museum exhibition and accompanying catalog "Toledo Designs For a Modern America."

In 2012, the Cooper-Hewitt, Smithsonian Design Museum acquired Baugh's "Design # 566 Decanter and Stopper, 1956", her only known work for Blenko Glass Company. She also invented a device to create certain blown glass pieces that is still in full use by Blenko to this day. Blenko acknowledges it was designed by Betty Baugh.

She was previously married to Wayne Husted (1927–2022), Blenko's design director from 1953 to 1963, and she had four children.
