= Canadian Clay and Glass Gallery =

Canadian Clay and Glass Gallery French: Musée candien de l'argile et du verre
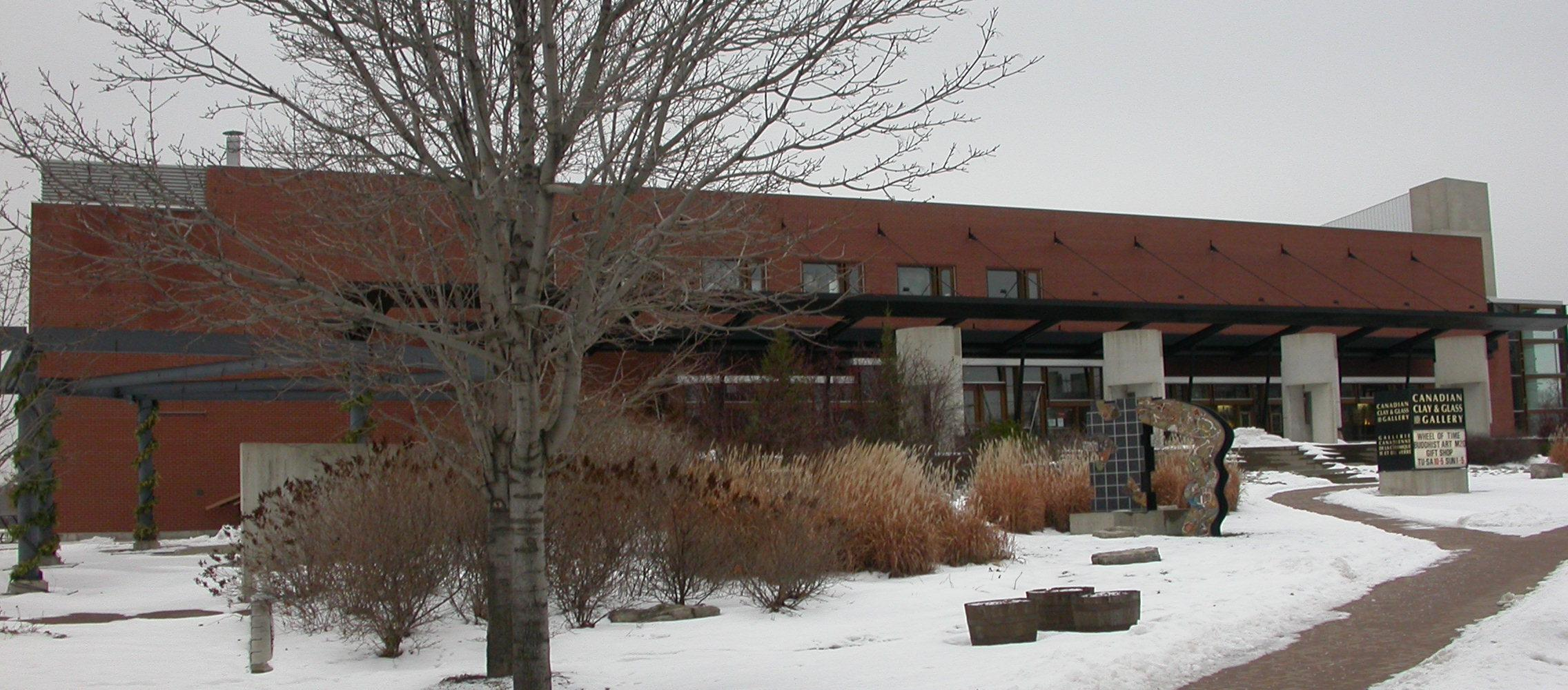

- Location of the gallery in Waterloo
- Established: June 1993
- Location: Waterloo, Ontario, Canada
- Coordinates: 43.465007°N 80.526097°W
- Type: Art Museum
- Collection size: 1,200
- Visitors: 25,000
- Executive director: Sarah Stanners
- Website: www.theclayandglass.ca

The Canadian Clay and Glass Gallery (CCGG) is a public art gallery located in Waterloo, Ontario, Canada. It is the only Canadian art gallery exclusively dedicated to exhibiting and collecting contemporary Canadian ceramic, glass, enamel and stained glass works of art. It has approximately 20,000 annual visitors.

The Canadian Guild of Potters — which would later become known as Ceramists Canada —was formed in 1936. Concurrent with the founding of the guild came the first thought of establishing a national ceramics gallery. It wasn't until 45 years later that the idea gained traction. Construction of the gallery began in 1991 and the Canadian Clay & Glass Gallery opened in June 1993. The building was designed by Patkau Architects of Vancouver, who received a Medal of Excellence for the design under the Governor General's Awards for Architecture program in June 1997.

The gallery has more than nine hundred items in the permanent collection and five exhibiting galleries.

== Building history ==
=== Construction ===
At a Ceramists Canada meeting in 1981 came a renewed call to find a permanent home for the country's finest ceramic pieces. This was prompted by a desire to honour the memory of recently dead Canadian potter Ruth Gowdy McKinley. The Glass Art Association of Canada and Artists in Stained Glass later became enthusiastic collaborators as the gallery concept evolved to also incorporate glass, stained glass, and enamel works.

Calgary, Halifax, North York, Victoria, and Waterloo were investigated and evaluated as potential sites for the national gallery. During the Ceramists Canada 1982 Annual General Meeting, Waterloo emerged as the clear choice on the strength of its commitment to provide a prime uptown location.

Over the next nine years, a core team of volunteers guided the planning and conducted the fundraising essential for a project of such magnitude. A 1984 feasibility study, funded by the federal and provincial governments, validated the need for a national gallery dedicated to the ceramic arts.

In October 1986, a national architectural competition was held, inviting eight firms from across Canada for submissions. Vancouver architects John and Patricia Patkau finished first and subsequently transformed the property at the corner of Caroline and Erb Streets from an aged hockey arena into a cultural edifice.

1991 witnessed the start of construction and the Gallery officially opened its doors on June 19, 1993.

== Operations ==
The Canadian Clay & Glass Gallery was incorporated as a not-for-profit public gallery in 1982 and is registered as a charitable organization. The Gallery's building in Uptown Waterloo is owned, managed, and maintained by the City of Waterloo. Under the terms of a 1994 lease agreement, the Gallery will remain the building's primary tenant for a 50-year term.

=== Funding ===
Currently The Clay & Glass receives annual and multi-year funding from the three levels of Canadian government –– municipal, provincial and federal. This operating support is distributed by the Canada Council for the Arts, the Ontario Arts Council, Ontario Trillium Foundation, Museum Assistance Program and the City of Waterloo. The current operating budget is derived from three main revenue sources: government grants, community support and earned revenue.

=== Administrative ===
The Clay & Glass operates with an independent volunteer board of directors who provide oversight to the full-time Executive Director and staff. The Gallery is run by six departments, each headed by a full or part-time staff member. These departments include: Curatorial, Development, Marketing, Collections Management, Programming, and Gallery Shop.

== Exhibitions ==
The gallery opened in 1993 with the purpose of exhibiting glass, ceramic, or enamel works. The Canadian Clay & Glass Gallery's exhibition mandate is to show contemporary work in these media. Since opening, The Clay & Glass has mounted over 178 exhibitions that have included works by artists from 25 countries. As such, the types of work exhibited have expanded greatly to include installation, video, performance, ephemeral, and environmental works. The gallery has 6088 square feet of exhibition space throughout five galleries: the Keith & Winifred Shantz Gallery, Donald & Pamela Bierstock Circular Gallery, The Mutual Group Tower Gallery, Dr. Douglas Wright Education Gallery, and the John A. Pollock Family Courtyard Gallery.

== Permanent collections ==
One of the Canadian Clay & Glass Gallery's key objectives is the development, management and conservation of its Permanent Collection to the highest art museum standards for the benefit and enjoyment of present and future audiences. The collection mandate is to acquire ceramic, glass, enamel and stained glass. The primary permanent collection currently comprises over 900 works. In keeping with a mandate of being an institution whose focus is on contemporary practice, the Gallery's art collection features works of art from the mid-20th century to the present.

The collection began with a donation of about 200 pieces. This gift provided the foundation and first major grouping around which the permanent collection would be built. Indusmin, a mining company providing raw silica products, was a corporate supporter and collector of silica based artworks for many years. Eventually the company was bought out and merged with another company called Unimin Canada Ltd., who acquired the former's vast art collection. Unimin Canada Ltd. wished to support the emerging national gallery and donated the Indusmin collection to the Gallery in 1991.

As the gallery developed and expanded, curatorial interest changed along with staff. The collecting policy gradually shifted to focusing on contemporary practice. One aspect of adding to the collection, which is taking precedence, is the acquisition of work that has been part of the Gallery's exhibitions.

=== Cultural Property ===
On June 30, 2008, the Gallery was granted Category 'A' status within the Cultural Properties Export and Import Act. The Minister of Canadian Heritage provides this designation to "institutions that have the capacity to ensure their long-term preservation and to make them accessible to the public through research, exhibitions, publications and websites." In effect, the Government of Canada entrusts the Gallery to house and steward artworks deemed to be national treasures, on behalf of the people of Canada. The Canadian Clay and Glass Gallery is honoured to be an institutional custodian of works of cultural importance on behalf of Canadians everywhere.

=== Study Collection ===
The Gallery has an extensive education and scholarly Study Collection. This collection comprises primarily industrial or functional objects, including paperweights, bottles, technical objects, vessels, commercial pressed glass and ceramic moulds. These objects are available for academics, researchers and other artists to touch, feel and inspect. This collection is also the foundation upon which an extensive educational curriculum is based. The gallery uses these materials primarily as a "study collection".

=== Archives ===
The Ann Roberts Archival Centre holds an extensive and growing number of archives. Currently there are over 8 fonds from individual artists, galleries, companies, scholars and organizations. They consist of unique primary materials such as personal papers, notebooks, sketchbooks, scrapbooks, drawings, blueprints, ephemera, photographs, slides, and transparencies. The archival collections are available for use by researchers.

==== Library ====
The Sinclair Family Research Library of the Canadian Clay & Glass Gallery is Canada's foremost library on the art and history of glass and ceramics. The library has an extensive holding of Exhibition catalogues, both from the venue itself and outside, trade publications related to the fields of glass and ceramics, works on paper, slides of the collection and early gallery, as well as educational movies. The library is open to Academics, persons interested in the field, practising artists as well as the public by appointment.

== Public programming ==
The educational offerings have evolved to include regular ongoing school and after-school programs, spring and summer art camps, teen- and family-focused sessions, youth public art projects, and adult workshops for both beginners and experienced artists. Most of the recreational educational offerings are intended to help individuals develop an arts vocabulary and gain enough knowledge to interpret and appreciate contemporary glass, ceramic, and enamel artworks. Over 4,000 children participate in curriculum-based school programs. General public programming includes the very successful Play with Clay program, and public lectures. The four completed Youth Public Art Projects gave local high school students the opportunity to collaborate on a permanent, large-scale artwork that deals with current art issues and that has a visible presence in their community.

== See also ==
- List of art museums
- List of museums in Ontario
