= Judy Moonelis =

American ceramist

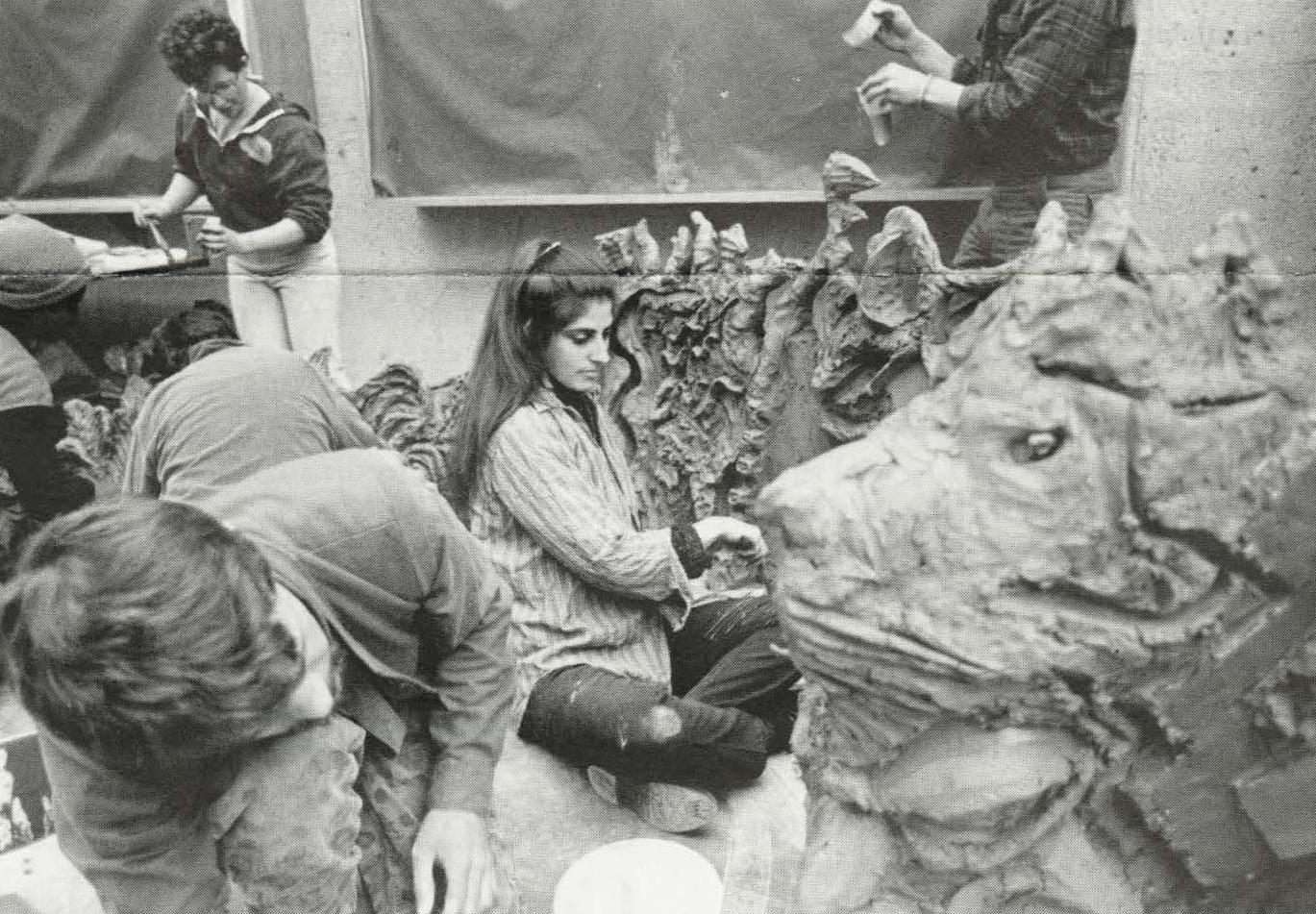
- Moonelis (center) in 1986
- Born: 1953 (age 71–72); New York, New York, U.S.
- Occupation: Ceramist

Judy Moonelis (born 1953) is an American ceramist.

Born in Jackson Heights, Queens, Moonelis earned her Bachelor of Fine Arts degree cum laude at the Tyler School of Art at Temple University in 1975; she received a Master of Fine Arts Degree from the New York State College of Ceramics at Alfred University in 1978, in which year she received the Menno Alexander Reeb Memorial Award for sculpture from the Albright-Knox Art Gallery. In 1980 she received a fellowship from the National Endowment for the Arts. She has had a studio in Manhattan, and taught ceramics at New York University in addition to serving at guest artist or visiting artist at numerous organizations. Moonelis produces largely figural work, including a series derived from the masks used in Ancient Greek theatre. Two of her works are in the collection of the Renwick Gallery of the Smithsonian Institution.
