= Packard Jennings =

American artist (born 1970)

- Born: 1970 (age 54–55); Oakland, California, United States
- Education: New York State College of Ceramics at Alfred University (MFA), San Francisco State University (BA)
- Known for: Street art, conceptual art, culture jamming, sculpture, drawing

Packard Jennings (born 1970) is an American visual artist. In his work he appropriates pop culture symbols and references to create new meaning using a variety of media including printmaking, sculpture, animation, video, and pamphleteering. In Jennings early career he modified billboards, a common practice of culture jammers. He has been working on a police mindfulness meditation project since 2012.

His work is in the collection of the Manetti Shrem Museum of Art, and Di Rosa Center for Contemporary Art. His work is in several books, including: “Art and Agenda” Gestalten, 2011, "We Own the Night (art of the Underbelly Project)” Rizzoli, 2011 and "Urban Interventions" Gestalten, 2010. His shopdropping work 'Anarchist Action figure was described on the front page of The New York Times.

== Themes ==
- "Anarchism" – Jennings's work often deals with the philosophy of anarchism, how it's represented in the media, and the representation of a naive utopia primarily through primitivism, not to be confused with anarchism or anarchy.
- Consumer culture – Jennings has created a fake corporation, the Centennial Society, as well as entire bodies of work that served as criticisms of Wal-Mart, the tobacco industry and the commodification of dissent.

== Works ==
- Anarchist Action Figure – a boxed, cast plastic anarchist action figure complete with molotov cocktail and dense, academic language about destroying the state on the outside. This was placed in a Target store and purchased in December 2007. The event was captured with a video surveillance camera mounted in a backpack.
- Mussolini Action Figure – a packaged, vacuum formed plastic Benito Mussolini action figure, which Jennings left in an Upstate New York Wal-Mart and later had purchased. In a video of the event on Jennings website, the clerk can not scan the item, so manually enters "MUSSOLINI $5.00" which Jennings shows at exhibitions. The first completely hand-made art object covertly 'shop-dropped' into stores in 1998.
- A Day at The Mall – first in a series of small pamphlets which Jennings distributed both online and physically. The airline evacuation style comics depict everyday people erupting into riots and later forming primitive societies and have been popular on the internet.
- Fallen Rapper Pez – hand crafted and cast Pez versions of Tupac Shakur, Eazy-E, and Biggie Smalls. These prototypes were sent to Pez Candy. Pez responded with the statement that "The Fallen Rapper Pez are not appropriate to our target audience of three to six year-olds."

== Shopdropping ==
Jennings has made major contributions to the practice of "shopdropping" (a term coined around 2004 to describe the covert placing of art or propaganda into stores). Jennings was a very early practitioner of what was to become "shopdropping". He was the first to covertly place a completely hand-made art object into a store with his 1998 with his Walmart Project, which features seven art products placed in Walmart stores, including the Mussolini Action Figure, which are humorously critical of aspects of their business practice. Other shopdropped works include: A Day at The Mall (pamphlet), Welcome to Geneva (pamphlet), the Anarchist Action Figure, Walgreens Local Business Coupon, and the Pocket Survival Guide.

== Lawsuits ==
Jennings was legally threatened by Chiquita Banana for posting fake Chiquita Banana stickers that said 'Chemical' on his website Destructables.org. He responded to the Chiquita with three more designs based on Chiquita Banana business practice, including: Deforest, Cocaine, and Terrorism.

Jennings sent a cease and f**king desist letter to a tech company that used his artwork in their ad to find a new employee. He won a settlement.

== Destructables.org ==
In 2011, Jennings launched Destructables.org. The site states:

"Destructables.org is an advertising-free Do It Yourself website for projects of protest and creative dissent. The site features user-generated step-by-step video and photo/text-based instructions for a wide range of dissenting actions, including (but not limited to): art actions, billboard alterations, shop-dropping, protest strategies, knit-bombing, making protest props, interventions, methods of civil disobedience, stencil work, performative actions, and many other forms of public dissent – from the practical and tactical to the creative and illegal. It is a living archive and resource for the art and activist communities."
