= Ayumi Horie =

American studio potter and digital marketer (born 1969)

AYUMI HORIE
- Born: Ayumi Horie; 1969
- Education: Mount Holyoke College. New York State College of Ceramics at Alfred University. University of Washington in Seattle
- Known for: Ceramics, Studio pottery
- Awards: 2015 United States Artist Distinguished Fellow in Craft

Ayumi Horie (born 1969) is a Portland, Maine-based studio potter. She is recognized for her unique aesthetic as well as for her pioneering use of digital marketing and social media within contemporary ceramics. She is curator of the popular Instagram feed Pots in Action and is a 2015 United States Artist Distinguished Fellow in Craft.

== Early life and education ==
Horie was raised in Lewiston/Auburn Maine by a Japanese-American family. She worked with her hands from an early age and continues to find inspiration in Maine's people, landscape, architecture, objects and history of craft. Before studying ceramics, Horie worked as a documentary photographer, shooting for weekly newspapers in Seattle. She sees a connection between her photographs of everyday life and her conceptual and formal interests as a potter. Horie holds a BA from Mount Holyoke College, a BFA in ceramics from the New York State College of Ceramics at Alfred University and a MFA in ceramics from the University of Washington in Seattle.

== Work ==
Horie is known for her functional pots, often featuring drawings of animals, made using a waterless throwing technique that preserves the gestural quality of clay. This "dry throwing" technique, developed while an undergraduate at Alfred, records evidence of the history of each pot's making. Fingerprints and imperfections inherent in clay such as stretching, cracking, and sagging create a sense of vulnerability and emotional connection to the user. The hand-scratched sgraffito animal drawings on her pots are inspired equally by natural history illustrations and Japanese manga. The "cuteness" of these images, heightened by the bold and playful use of color, is a way of further eliciting a sense of softness and humanity. In addition to her studio practice, Horie works collaboratively on projects that consider the relationship between ceramics and the wider community.

Horie's work is in various collections throughout the United States, including the Museum of Arts and Design, New York. Her solo and two-person exhibitions include Greenwich House Pottery, New York; Red Lodge Clay Center, Red Lodge Clay Center, MT; Akar Gallery, Iowa City, IA; Formargruppen, Malmo, Sweden; Lux Center for the Arts, Lincoln, NE; Kobo, Seattle, WA; Lill Street, Chicago; and Northern Clay Center, Minneapolis, MN. Her work has been featured in T: The New York Times Style Magazine online edition, Design Sponge, Ceramics Monthly, Uppercase Magazine, Studio Potter, American Craft Magazine online edition, and others.

== Community engagement ==
For Horie, pots not only create intimacy between individuals but can deepen connections to community and become agents of social change. She is the curator of the Instagram feed Pots in Action, one of the first crowdsourced projects in ceramics, featuring contributions and guest hosts from around the world. The project evolved from a personal website begun in 2005, in which she collected photographs of her pots in use in daily life and plotted them on a Google Map.

Horie has co-organized multiple online craft-based fundraisers, beginning with Obamaware in 2008 which was the first online fundraiser of its kind and gained unprecedented response beyond the usual ceramic audience. This was followed by Handmade For Japan in 2011, which raised over $100,000 for disaster relief following the great East Japan earthquake and tsunami.

Understanding handcraft to be a political choice that celebrates individual creativity within a society based on mass consumerism, Horie works to expand the audience for functional pottery and to showcase clay as a medium that uniquely reflects everyday human experience. Since 2002, she has participated in the Artstream Nomadic Gallery, a restored 1967 Airstream trailer that operates as a mobile alternative exhibition space and has traveled to over 150 locations. In 2009, she collaborated on a tile mapping installation at Greenwich House Pottery, which used data from the Mannahatta Project to raise ecological awareness. Begun in 2015, Portland Brick is a collaborative public art project that repairs the sidewalks of Portland, Maine with bricks made from local clay that are stamped with the city's histories, memories, and wishes for the future and invites further participation through live events and a website. Horie travels widely to lecture and give workshops on ceramics and social media, including at Alfred University, Anderson Ranch, Arizona State University, Archie Bray Foundation, Haystack Mountain School of Crafts, Penland School of Crafts, Penn State University, Pratt Institute, the Rhode Island School of Design, and Virginia Commonwealth University, and was Clay Coordinator for three years at Women's Studio Workshop. She has served on multiple boards including that of the Archie Bray Foundation, the American Craft Council and accessCeramics.org.

== Awards ==
Horie has received numerous awards and honors in the field, including:

- 2015 United States Artist Distinguished Fellow in Craft
- 2014 Maine Arts Commission grant for Portland Brick†
- 2014 Kindling Fund grant for Portland Brick†
- 2014 Portland Public Art Commission grant for Portland Brick†
- 2011 Inaugural recipient, Ceramics Monthly Ceramic Artist of the Year
- 2009 Select Prize, Ulsan International Onggi Competition, Korea
- 2009 Skutt Purchase Award, NCECA Biennial Exhibition, Phoenix, AZ
- 2008 Residency, Guldagergaard International Ceramic Center, Skaelskor, Denmark
- 1996-1998 Residency, Archie Bray Foundation for the Ceramic Arts

†Award for Portland Brick, public collaboration with Elise Pepple
