= Tony Marsh (artist) =

American contemporary ceramic artist (born 1954)

- Born: 26 May 1954; New York City, New York, United States
- Education: California State University, Long Beach BFA (1978); Apprenticeship under Japanese potter Shimaoka (1978 – 1981); New York State College of Ceramics, Alfred University MFA (1989)
- Known for: Ceramic art

Anthony "Tony" Marsh (born May 26, 1954) is an American contemporary ceramic artist who lives and works in San pedro, California.

== Career ==
Marsh received a Bachelor of Fine Arts in 1978 from California State University Long Beach. From 1978 to 1981, Marsh studied as an apprentice under Japanese potter Tatsuzō Shimaoka, in Mashiko, Japan. Marsh worked with Shimaoka's shokunin, or craftsmen, on a daily basis and was influenced by the traditional culture of the community, which differed from Marsh's experience of art-making in the United States. After leaving Japan, Marsh received a Master of Fine Arts degree in 1988 from New York State College of Ceramics at Alfred University. In 1989 Marsh was hired to teach at his undergraduate alma mater, Cal State Long Beach, where he continues to be a professor of art and head of the ceramics department as well as the first director of Center for the Contemporary Ceramics. Tony Marsh’s work has been included as permanent collection at MOCA Los Angeles, The Nasher Sculpture Center, SFMOMA, The Hammer Museum Los Angeles, Metropolitan Museum of Art, NYC, Los Angeles County Museum of Art, Museum of Art & Design, New York, de Young Museum, San Francisco, Dorthy & George Saxe Collection, Musee d’Arte Moderne, Paris, The Museum of Fine Arts, Houston, Everson Museum of Art, Syracuse, NY, M+ Museum, Hong Kong, Orange County Museum of Art, California, Newark Museum of Art, New Jersey, Racine Art Museum, Racine Wisconsin, Gardiner Museum of Ceramic Art, Toronto, The Contemporary Museum, Honolulu, HI, Minneapolis Institute for the Arts, San Jose Museum of Art, Museum of Contemporary International Ceramic Art, Inchon, S. Korea, The Crocker Art Museum, Sacramento, Boise Art Museum, Idaho USA, Oakland Museum of Art, The Archie Bray Collection, USA, Laguna Beach Art Museum, CA, Lora Eccles Harrison Museum Logan, Utah, Taipei Ceramics Museum, Taiwan, Maher Collection, Scripps College, Claremont, CA, ASU Art Museum, Tempe, Arizona, Foshan Museum of Contemporary Art, Foshan, China, Long Beach Museum of Art, Long Beach, CA, Daum Museum, Missouri, Cranbrook Museum of Art, Resnik Collection of Contemporary Art, Los Angeles, General Mills Corporation Monterey Museum of Art, JINRO Cultural Foundation, Seoul, Korea

== Sources ==
- Marsh, Tony. "Art as Homage", Studio Potter 29, number 2.
- Marsh, Tony. General Artist's Statement, December 2001.
- Tony Marsh at Pierre Marie Giraud, Brussels
- Tony Marsh at Hedge, San Francisco, CA

https://www.albertzbenda.com/artists/42-tony-marsh/ at Albertz Benda, New York, NY and Los Angeles, CA

http://www.tonymarshceramics.com
