= Wayne Higby =

American artist working in ceramics (born 1943)

D. Wayne Higby (born 12 May 1943 in Colorado, USA) is an American artist working in ceramics. The American Craft Museum considers him a "visionary of the American Crafts Movement" and recognized him as one of seven artists who are "genuine living legends representing the best of American artists in their chosen medium."

== Biography ==
Born in Colorado Springs, Colorado, Higby received a B.F.A. from the University of Colorado at Boulder, in 1966, and an M.F.A. from the University of Michigan, Ann Arbor, in 1968. Since 1973, he has been on the faculty of the New York State College of Ceramics at Alfred University, Alfred, NY.

Working both as a ceramic artist and an educator, Higby has earned international recognition since his one-person show at the American Craft Museum in 1973. His work focuses on "landscape imagery as a focal point of meditation", and ranges from the vessel form to tile and sculptural works. Rather than focusing on its functional aspects, Higby uses the vessel form as a vehicle for imagery, often inspired by the western landscapes of his childhood, that highlights the interplay between light, space, and time.

"I strive to establish a zone of quiet coherence – a place full of silent, empty space where finite and infinite, intimate and immense intersect."

He is known for his inventive use of Raku earthenware, and an interest in porcelain following his experiences travelling and lecturing in China, where he has worked with artists to revitalize Chinese Ceramic art. He is Honorary President and co-founder(with Jackson Li) of the Sanbao Ceramic Art Institute at Jingdezhen, and an Honorary Professor of Art at both the Jingdezhen Ceramic Institute and at Shanghai University, People’s Republic of China.

He is also vice president of the International Academy of Ceramics in Geneva, Switzerland.

Ceramic artist Victoria MacKenzie-Childs, taught by Higby at Alfred University in the 1970s, credits Higby as a lifelong mentor.

== Academic appointments ==
- New York State College of Ceramics at Alfred University, Alfred, NY, 1973–present
- Rhode Island School of Design, Providence, Rhode Island, 1970–73
- University of Nebraska at Omaha, 1968–1970

== Awards ==
- Distinguished Educator Award, James Renwick Alliance, 2002
- Honorary Professor of Art, College of Fine Arts, Shanghai University, 2000
- Recognition of Excellence, American Ceramic Society, 1998
- American Craft Movement Visionary Award, American Craft Museum, 1995
- College of Fellows, American Craft Council, 1995
- Honorary Professor of Ceramic Art, Jingdezhen Ceramic Institute, P.R. of China, 1995
- Chancellor’s Award for Excellence in Teaching, State University of New York, 1993
- Master Teacher Award, University of Hartford, Hartford, CT, 1990
- George A. and Eliza Howard Foundation Fellowship, 1986
- New York Foundation for the Arts Fellowship, 1985, 1989
- National Endowment for the Arts Fellowship, 1973, 1977, 1988

== Solo exhibitions ==
- Wayne Higby: Landscape as Memory, 1990–1999, Museum of Art & Design, Helsinki, Finland, 1999
- Morgan Gallery, Kansas City, MO, 1991, 1997
- Hartford Art School, University of Hartford, CT, 1990
- Helen Drutt Gallery, New York, NY, 1988, 1990
- Greenwich House Pottery, New York, NY, 1984
- Okun-Thomas Gallery, St. Louis, MO, 1979
- Helen Drutt Gallery, Philadelphia, PA, 1976, 1978, 1979, 1980, 1982, 1996
- Exhibit A, Gallery of American Ceramics, Evanston, IL, 1975, 1978, 1980
- Museum of Contemporary Crafts (American Craft Museum), New York, NY, 1973
- Benson Gallery, Bridgehampton, Long Island, NY, 1971
- Archie Bray Foundation, Helena, MT, 1970
- Joslyn Art Museum, Omaha, NE, 1969

== Work in public collections ==
- American Craft Museum (now The Museum of Arts & Design), New York City, NY, USA
- Brooklyn Museum of Art, New York City, NY, USA
- Carnegie Institute, Museum of Art, Pittsburgh, PA, USA
- Honolulu Museum of Art, Honolulu, HI, USA
- Denver Art Museum, Denver, CO, USA
- Everson Museum of Art, Syracuse, NY, USA
- Fine Arts Museums of San Francisco, San Francisco, CA, USA
- Jingdezhen Museum of Art, P.R. China
- Los Angeles County Museum of Art, Los Angeles, CA, USA
- Metropolitan Museum of Art, New York City, NY, USA
- Minneapolis Institute of Arts, Minneapolis, MN, USA
- Museum for Contemporary art Het Kruithuis, 's-Hertogenbosch, The Netherlands
- Museum of Fine Arts, Boston, Boston, Massachusetts, USA
- Museum of Fine Arts, Houston, Houston, TX, USA
- National Museum of Modern Art, Tokyo, Japan
- Renwick Gallery, Smithsonian American Art Museum, Washington, DC, USA
- Philadelphia Museum of Art, Philadelphia, PA, USA
- Schein-Joseph International Museum of Ceramic Art, Alfred, NY, USA
- Smithsonian American Art Museum, Washington, DC, USA
- University of Michigan Museum of Art, Ann Arbor, MI, USA
- Victoria and Albert Museum, London, UK
