= Linda Sormin =

Thai-Canadian ceramic artist

- Born: 1971; Bangkok, Thailand
- Known for: Artist, educator
- Style: Ceramics, mixed-media, installation art
- Website: lindasormin.com

Linda Sormin (born 1971, Bangkok, Thailand) is a Canadian artist known for her ceramics and installations. As a young child Sormin immigrated from Thailand to Canada. She attended Andrews University, Sheridan College, and Alfred University. She teaches at New York University.

In 2011 her work was included in the exhibition Overthrown: Clay Without Limits at the Denver Art Museum. In 2013 she was selected one of the 5 participants in the RBC (Royal Bank of Canada) Emerging Artist People’s Choice Award competition held at the Gardiner Museum. In 2018, she held a solo exhibition entitled Fierce Passengers at the Carleton University Art Gallery. In 2021 Sormin was included in the exhibition No Boundaries: Contemporary Canadian Ceramics at Messum's London and Wiltshire locations. The same year, she mounted a site-specific, monumental installation entitled Stream for Ceramics in the Expanded Field at the Massachusetts Museum of Contemporary Art. She also created a site-specific, multimedia installation for the Museum of Fine Arts, Boston in 2023.

Her work is in the collection of the Gardiner Museum and the Victoria and Albert Museum. Her piece, Ta Saparot (pineapple eyes), was acquired by the Smithsonian American Art Museum as part of the Renwick Gallery's 50th Anniversary Campaign.

== Style and process ==
In her non-linear, ambiguous, and generative work, Linda Sormin explores the charged lives of her materials. Assembling her sculptures from discarded objects, textural ceramics, and flickering gold leaf, the artist sees her art on a continuum with that of her Indonesian and Chinese-Thai ancestors. One of Sormin's gallerists describes her work in the following terms:

"Linda Sormin’s sculptures are a journey through personal archeology. Her open-ended ceramics enfold many voices and labors, from the donated memorabilia of friends and strangers in distant places, to the hands of those assisting, to the dumpster diving, searching for the discarded. The complex membranes of pinched clay provide a porous conduit bridging and breaking bonds, entwining stories and histories among those who define themselves through their separations."

Migratory, oceanic, and fluctuating, Sormin’s multi-media treatment of the Asian diasporic experience is fragmented and sutured, but expansive. Sormin brings disparate stories and unexpected forms into conversation with one another through creative alignments and misalignments. In his review of Ceramics in the Expanded Field, Murray Whyte wrote:

"Linda Sormin’s tangle of jagged sheet metal, video screens, iron pipe and vibrant clay and ceramic forms make a good case; it’s a chaotic amalgam of material and form so ragged and violent it looks like the aftermath of a natural disaster. I like what it’s saying: Tear it down, start again. The rules have changed."

Janet Koplos reviewed the same exhibition in Art in America, and noted the scale and accumulative nature of Sormin's installation:

"The most impressive work in the show is Linda Sormin’s gargantuan agglomeration of tangled clay tubes, numerous video screens of varying size, a section of a spiral staircase, a dragon head used in Chinese festival dances, and detritus, arcing through the air within and around a zigzag metal framework. Though static, the form suggests exuberant motion, like a whiplashing fire hose. The creation might seem at first apocalyptic, a triumph of disorder; to the contrary, its title, Stream (2020–21), highlights the video images of flowing water and abstract patterns as well as the sculpture’s overall fluid aerial configuration, recalling the acrobatics of flying dragons in Chinese myth and art."
