= Walter McConnell =

American ceramic artist

Walter McConnell is an American ceramic artist living and working in Belmont, New York. He is most recognized for his unfired ceramic installations addressing the relationship between nature and culture – more specifically, the means through which contemporary culture constructs an understanding of nature. McConnell currently serves as an Associate Professor of Ceramic Art at the New York State College of Ceramics at Alfred University, in Alfred, New York.

== Biography ==
McConnell was born in Philadelphia, Pennsylvania in 1956. He attended the University of Connecticut, Storrs, where he received a BFA in Ceramics and Painting in 1978. McConnell earned his MFA in ceramics from the New York State College of Ceramics at Alfred University in 1986.

== Artwork ==
McConnell states of his work: “My work is a mediation on my relationship to nature within a culture decisively alienated from it. In a technological age, where contact with nature is at best indirect and our experience of it variously defined and mediated by the culture we inhabit, my work is a site where I negotiate conflicting ideas about the natural world and forge a connection to it.”

== Unfired Ceramic Installations ==
McConnell’s unfired installations typically feature scenes reminiscent of an imagined natural world, rich in their own fecundity. All manner of flora abound within the spaces he creates. The individual forms from which the scenes are assembled vary in their rendering. In a single environment, McConnell may display forms that are directly reminiscent of natural vegetation, “meaty succulents, low lying flowers, ferns, and the like,” while simultaneously providing more abstracted forms – some of which would best be described as fecal. In many instances, McConnell also juxtaposes these elements with kitsch imagery, such as garden bunnies or the figure of Snow White. This mass of natural and manipulated imagery, at times rendered with up to 2000 pounds of raw terra cotta, typically resides within a thin plastic enclosure extending toward the ceiling. Within the terrarium-like environments a single light illuminates the raw clay within, creating a space moist from condensation emanating from the unfired clay. Jeanne Quinn describes the experience of standing in front of these works: “In McConnell’s constructions, he perfectly creates the idea of the walled garden, of the desired place that cannot be entered. …with its translucent veil of plastic that contains all the sensuality of the wet, sculpted clay, we cannot quite see what is within. A mist of droplets, of evaporated water, a seemingly ephemeral, insignificant screen, prevents us from seeing the interior.” Interpretations of these works are varied. Mitchell Merback writes of McConnell’s unfired works, “On the one hand we have real-time systems that exist in a space that is frankly architectural. When activated by light and heat, the changing biosphere also references the duration of our encounter with it. …they are concrete and real. …On the other hand, we have an artist determined to expose what is perhaps the key cultural precondition of today’s ecological depredations: not merely the alienation of culture from nature, but the displacement of nature by its cultural representation.” Merback continues, “It is no longer the old lamentable case of our being estranged from what is real in nature, but that the real has been driven to extinction by its ever-widening simulation.”

== Theory of Everything Series ==
McConnell, in more recent years, has been displaying works constructed wholly of slip cast (see slipcasting) elements arranged into larger architectural structures. The individual forms presented in these works include such imagery as animal sculptures, Christmas trees, figures from popular culture, religious icons and faux Ming vases. These objects are derived from a bevy of plaster molds intended for the hobby ceramics industry – from which McConnell casts and fires before arranging them into larger, singular structures. Holly Henessian describes her reaction to one of these works, Theory of Everything (Blue version), “The Virgin Mary and E.T. were shoved together with other luminous characters from TV, creating a fantasia of delight.” She also states, “His final overall forms are simple shapes such as cones or mountains that are primary to our human collective consciousness.” In March, 2007, McConnell displayed a white version of his Theory of Everything at the Cross McKenzie Ceramic Art gallery in Washington DC. The Cross McKenzie website describes the work: “Ultimately, the finished work transcends its kitsch and commercial elements to create an architectural monument referencing Hindi Stupas [see Stupa] and is magically imbued with a sense of spirituality. McConnell's artistic sensibility transforms Western pop cultural waste into an Eastern aesthetic worthy of worship and offerings.”
