= Kim Dickey =

Colorardo artist

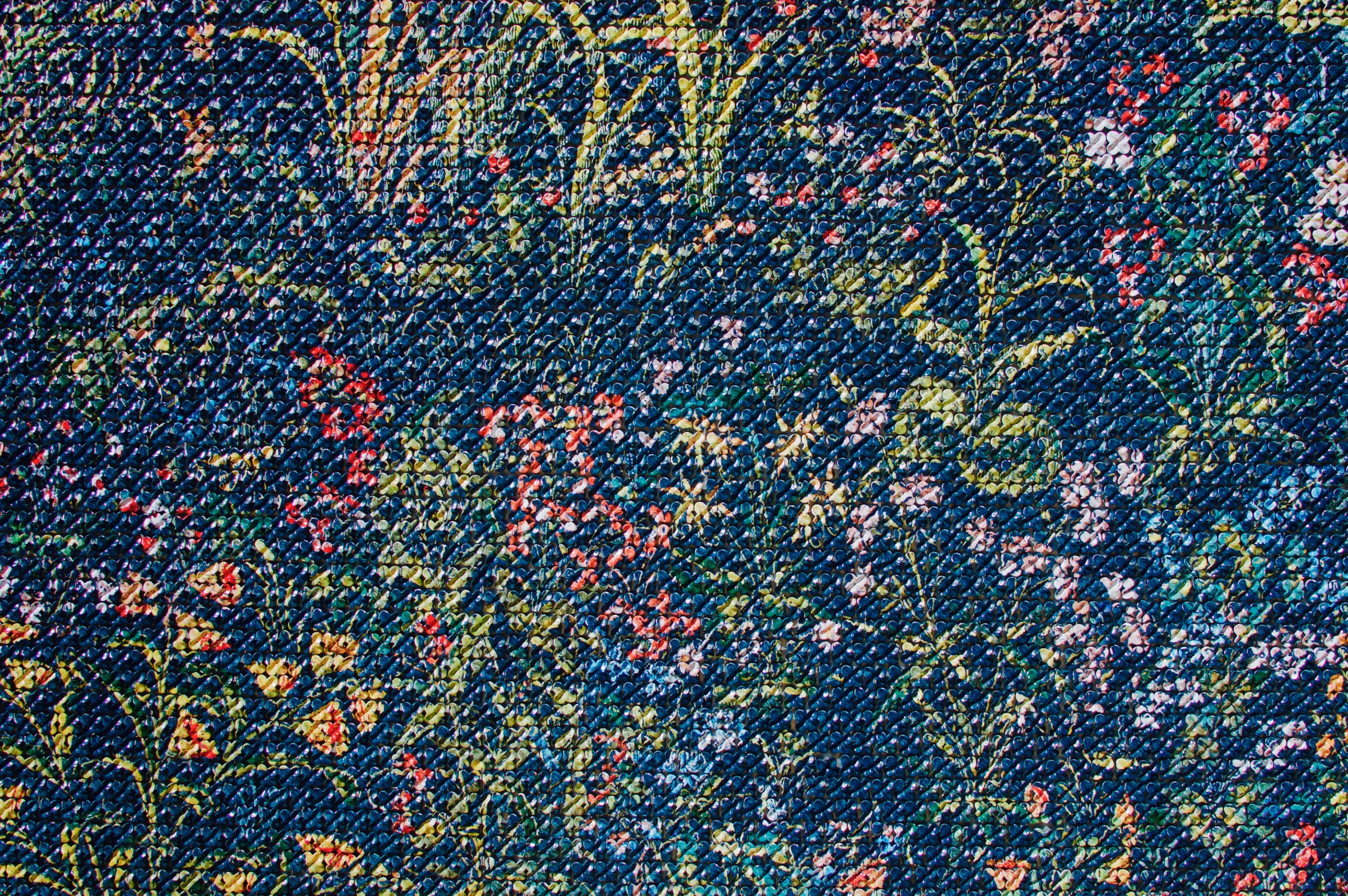
- Mille-fleur (2011), ceramic installation by Kim Dickey
- Born: United States
- Education: Rhode Island School of Design (BFA), Alfred University (MFA)
- Known for: Ceramic sculpture, conceptual installations
- Notable work: Words Are Leaves (2016), porcelain urinal series
- Movement: Contemporary art
- Awards: Featured retrospective at Museum of Contemporary Art Denver (2016)
- Website: Faculty page

Kim Dickey is a ceramic artist and Professor of Ceramics at the University of Colorado, in Boulder, Colorado. She received her BFA from the Rhode Island School of Design, in Providence, Rhode Island, followed by an MFA in ceramics from the New York State College of Ceramics at Alfred University. Dickey's work explores how people create meaning, as well as construct environments, with objects. Through this lens, Dickey creates works that are platforms on which memories, myths, nostalgia, and imagination can play.

Dickey's most familiar and controversial works are a series of functional handheld female urinals, constructed from porcelain. Dickey's sculptural work was featured in an extensive retrospective exhibition in 2016 titled Words Are Leaves at the Museum of Contemporary Art Denver.

== Bibliography links ==
- University of Colorado Museum
- Philadelphia City Paper
- Paglia, Michael (2 November 2016). "Review: Kim Dickey: Words Are Leaves Ranks With MCA Denver's Best". Archived from the original on 17 January 2021.
- CFILE (11 November 2015). "Exhibition : Kim Dickey: Cloistered Power in New Animal Sculptures". Archived from the original on 7 July 2021.
- Paglia, Michael (4 November 2015). "Review: Creepy Yet Elegant Works on View at Robischon Gallery". Archived from the original on 7 July 2021.
