= Robert Chapman Turner =

American potter

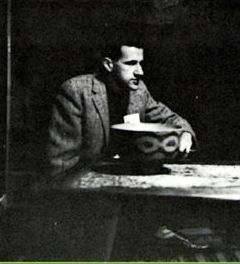
- Born: July 22, 1913
- Died: July 26, 2005 (aged 92)
- Occupation: Ceramist, artist
- Awards: Gold Medal for Consummate Craftsmanship (1993); Fellow of the American Craft Council (1977)

Robert Chapman Turner (July 22, 1913 – July 26, 2005) was an American potter known for his functional pottery, sculptural vessels and inspired teaching.

Born in Port Washington, New York, Turner attended Swarthmore College and graduated with a Bachelor of Arts degree in 1936. He then studied painting at the Pennsylvania Academy of Fine Arts and earned a Master of Fine Arts degree from the New York State College of Ceramics at Alfred University in 1949. Turner established the studio pottery program at Black Mountain College in North Carolina between 1949 and 1951. Later he returned to Alfred Station, establishing himself as a studio potter. In 1958, he joined the Alfred University faculty, where he remained until his retirement as Professor Emeritus of Ceramic Art in 1979.

Like many studio potters, Turner began his career producing functional ceramics. During the late 1960s, Turner turned to nonfunctional explorations of the vessel tradition. His many honors include an honorary doctorate in fine art from Swarthmore, the American Craft Council Gold medal, and the Member of Honor of the International Academy of Ceramics. The Milwaukee Art Museum organized a retrospective of his ceramics career, which toured from 1985 to 1987. Turner was also honored by the establishment of the Robert C. Turner Chair in Ceramic Art at Alfred University, now occupied by the well-known potter and ceramics teacher Wayne Higby. He died July 26, 2005, in Sandy Spring, Maryland.
