= Garth Clark =

Art critic from South Africa

Garth Clark is an art critic, art historian, curator, gallerist, and art dealer from Pretoria, South Africa.

Clark is a writer and commentator on modern and contemporary ceramic art and a critic of the craft movement. For twenty-seven years, Clark and his partner Mark Del Vecchio owned and operated Garth Clark Gallery in New York City, with other locations across the country and the world. Clark lives in Santa Fe, New Mexico where he is the founding Editor-in-Chief of CFile Foundation's online journal and publishing projects.

== Early life ==
Garth Clark discovered his interest in ceramic arts while he was living in South Africa. He received his master's degree from the Royal College of Art, London, in modern ceramic history, and became an expert in British pottery.

== Garth Clark Gallery ==
Garth Clark Gallery, co-founded and co-operated by Garth Clark and Mark Del Vecchio, began its life on Wilshire Boulevard in Los Angeles in 1981 with the inaugural exhibition, Beatrice Wood: A Very Private View. At their galleries in LA, Manhattan, Kansas City, and briefly London combined, Clark and Del Vecchio have been responsible for over 500 exhibitions (solo, group, theme, historical) over a period of 27 years. The gallery served as a resource for modern and contemporary ceramic art during its existence, serving an international audience of museums and collectors.

The gallery accelerated, sparked, and defined the careers of some artists in the field including Akio Takamori, Ron Nagle, Ruth Duckworth, Beth Cavener, Lucio Fontana, Ralph Bacerra, Carlo Zauli, Christine Nofchissey McHorse and more.

== Curator ==
Among the museum exhibitions he has curated internationally are A Century of Ceramics in the United States, Hans Coper in American Collections, Free Spirit: The New Native American Potter, and The Artful Teapot.

== Writer ==
Clark has written, edited and contributed to over sixty books on ceramic art and authored over two hundred essays, reviews, and monographs. Irving Blum, a contemporary art dealer called Clark, "ceramics’ great clarifier."

=== Books ===
- 2012 Dark Light: The Ceramics of Christine Nofchissey McHorse. Albuquerque: Fresco Fine Art Publications, llc.
  - Shifting Paradigns in Contemporary Ceramics: The Garth Clark and Mark Del Vecchio Collection. New Haven and London: Museum of Fine Arts of Houston and Yale University Press.
- 2008 How Envy Killed the Crafts Movement: An Autopsy in Two Parts. Portland: Museum of Contemporary Craft and Pacific Northwest College of Art.
- 2003 Richard Slee. London: Lund Humphries.
  - Shards: Garth Clark on Ceramic Art. New York: D.A.P.
- 2001 The Artful Teapot. London: Thames and Hudson.
  - Gilded Vessel, The Lustrous Art and Life of Beatrice Wood. Madison, WI: Guild Publishing.
- 1999 Alev Ebuzziya Siesbye. Istanbul: Kale.
- 1995 The Potter's Art: A Complete History of Pottery in Britain. London: Phaidon Press.
- 1990 The Book of Cups. New York: Abbeville Press.
- 1989 The Eccentric Teapot. New York: Abbeville Press.
- 1989 The Mad Potter of Biloxi – The Art & Life of George E. Ohr. New York: Abbeville Press.
- 1987 American Ceramics: 1876 to the Present. New York: Abbeville Press.
- 1986 American Potters Today, (with Oliver Watson). London: Victoria and Albert Museum.
- 1981 American Potters: The Work of 20 Modern Masters. New York: Watson-Guptill Publications.
- 1979 A Century of Ceramics in the United States 1878-1978. New York: Abbeville Press.
- 1976 Michael Cardew: A Portrait. London: Kodansha.
- 1974 Potters of Southern Africa (with Lynne Wagner). Cape Town: G. Struik and Co.

=== Books as editor ===
- 1982 Ceramic Millennium: Critical Writings on Ceramic History, Theory and Art: Halifax: NSCAD Press
- 1982 Ceramics and Modernism: The Response of Artist, Craftsman, Designer and Architect. Los Angeles.
- 1979 Transactions of the Ceramics Symposium 1979. Los Angeles. Institute for Ceramic History.
- 1978 Ceramic Art: Comment and Review 1882-1977. New York: E.P. Dutton.

== Honors and achievements ==
In 2005, Clark received the College Art Association's Mather Award for distinguished achievement in art journalism (previously awarded to Robert Hughes at Time and Roberta Smith at the New York Times, amongst others) for his anthology Shards: Garth Clark on Ceramic Art.

In addition, Clark has received lifetime achievements awards from several institutions, including Museum of Art and Design New York, National Council on Education for the Ceramics Arts, Friends of Contemporary Ceramics, Immigration Law Foundation, and the National Service to the Arts Award, Anderson Ranch, Aspen.

He has been awarded honorary doctorates from Staffordshire University in England and Kansas City Art Institute in Missouri, USA.

In 1998, he was made a Fellow of the Royal College of Art, London and a member of the Court at the school's 100th Convocation (his alma mater).

As far as book awards, Clark has received an "Art Book of the Year" Award from the Art Libraries Society of America, the Mather Award (see above) and a bronze medal for of Ceramic Millennium from the Independent Publishers Association.
