= New York State College of Ceramics at Alfred University =

Ceramics school of SUNY Alfred University

Coordinates: 42.253261°N 77.787486°W

The New York State College of Ceramics at Alfred University (NYSCC) is a statutory college of the State University of New York located on the campus of Alfred University in Alfred, New York. There are a total of 616 students, including 536 undergraduates and 80 graduates.

== History ==
The college was founded by an act signed into law on April 11, 1900, by Governor Theodore Roosevelt, establishing the New York State School of Clay-Working and Ceramics. This move by Alfred University to petition the New York State legislature in 1899 followed a period of crisis at the university starting in 1895, which was facing low enrollments, mounting deficits, and the recent resignation of then-president A.E. Main (1893–95). The trustees, with support from area businesses and alumni, recognized the trends in higher education toward applied sciences and technology and supported the decision to petition the legislature.

Charles Fergus Binns, a British ceramist, served as the first director of the school, after completing a career at Royal Worcester Porcelain Works. In 1932, it was renamed the New York State College of Ceramics (NYSCC) with two departments, General Technology and Engineering and Applied Art. The college is presently composed of the School of Art and Design, the Inamori School of Engineering and the Samuel R. Scholes Library. The college also houses the Inamori Museum of Fine Ceramics, one of two such collections in the world focused on technical ceramics and glass.

The Inamori School of Engineering at Alfred University offers programs in ceramics, glass, biomaterials, and materials science engineering. In addition, the programs in mechanical engineering and renewable energy engineering are offered through Alfred University, the private institution with which the NYSCC is affiliated. The School of Engineering is one of only two institutions in the U.S. that offers a B.S. in Ceramic Engineering and the only institution in the U.S. that offers degrees in glass science.

== Notable alumni ==
- Betty Baugh
- Margaret Boozer
- Cristina Córdova
- R. Guy Cowan
- Karon Doherty
- Kim Dickey
- Julia Galloway
- Maija Grotell
- Isaac Scott Hathaway
- Steve Heinemann
- Vivika Heino
- Ayumi Horie
- Packard Jennings
- Michael Lax
- Tony Marsh
- Walter McConnell
- Victoria MacKenzie-Childs
- Ruth Gowdy McKinley, first potter elected to Royal Canadian Academy of Art
- Rebekah Modrak
- Judy Moonelis
- William O'Connor
- Lisa Orr
- Ken Price
- Daniel Rhodes
- Norm Schulman
- Robert Chapman Turner
- Betty Woodman
- Arnold Zimmerman

== Notable faculty ==
- Charles Fergus Binns
- Daniel Rhodes
- Robert Chapman Turner
- Walter McConnell
- Wayne Higby
- Andrew Deutsch
- Paul DeMarinis
- Heather Mae Erickson
- William Underhill
