= Jeanne Quinn =

American ceramic artist

- Education: University of Washington
- Alma mater: Oberlin College
- Known for: Ceramic installations
- Website: http://www.jeannequinnstudio.com/

Jeanne Quinn is an American ceramic artist who works primarily with installations. She is a Professor in the Department of Art and Art History at the University of Colorado. She lives and works in Boulder, Colorado, and Brooklyn, New York.

She has been a resident artist at the MacDowell Colony, the Archie Bray Foundation, the European Ceramic Work Centre in the Netherlands, the International Ceramic Center in Denmark, and the Kahla Porcelain Factory and the Ceramic Center-Berlin in Germany.

== Exhibitions ==
Quinn's work has been exhibited internationally in several major museums and galleries, including the Denver Art Museum, Museum of Contemporary Art, Denver; Robischon Gallery, Denver; Greenwich House, New York City; Grimmerhus Museum, Denmark; Formargruppen Gallery, Malmö, Sweden; Sculpturens Hus, Stockholm, Sweden; and the New Taipei City Yingge Ceramics Museum, New Taipei City, Taiwan.

== Sources ==
Her work is included in the books The Artful Teapot, by Garth Clark; Postmodern Ceramics, by Mark Del Vecchio; Sex Pots, by Paul Matthieu; A Ceramic Continuum: Fifty Years of the Archie Bray Influence, by Peter Held, and Confrontational Ceramics, by Judith Schwartz.
