= Alfred Ceramic Art Museum =

Museum in Alfred University, New York state

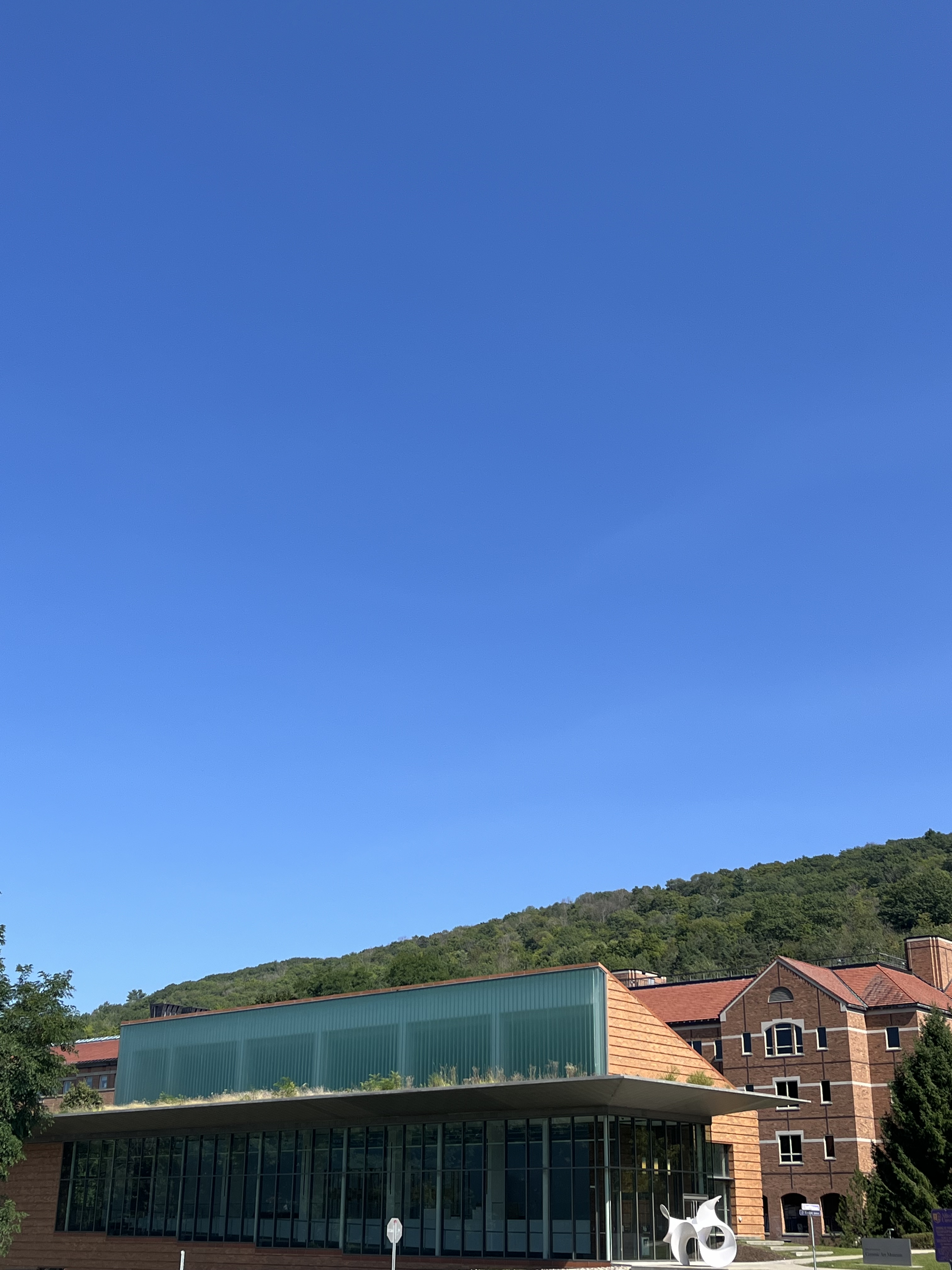

- Location in New York State
- Location: Main and Pine Streets; Alfred, New York
- Coordinates: 42°15′23″N 77°47′19″W
- Owner: Alfred University
- Website: http://ceramicsmuseum.alfred.edu/

The Alfred Ceramic Art Museum at Alfred University in Alfred, New York, United States houses nearly 8,000 ceramic and glass objects by internationally known ceramic artists. While originally housed in 1,500 sq. ft. of exhibition space in the New York State College of Ceramics' Binns-Merrill Hall, the museum's new building was constructed in 2014 by KMW Architects to allow the museum to grow since the village of Alfred is known as a ceramics mecca.

Its collection includes ancient ceramics of anthropological interest, examples of historical and contemporary ceramic art and craft, and advanced ceramics created utilizing advanced ceramic engineering technology. The new building is located on the site of the former Davis Gym, on Pine Street just past its intersection with Main Street. Construction began June 2014 on a $10 million Alfred Museum of Ceramic Art. The university received a private donation to cover the cost of the new museum.

The museum is a teaching and research facility, and part of Alfred University.
