= Frances =

French and English given name of Latin origin

Frances is an English given name or last name of Latin origin. In Latin the meaning of the name Frances is 'from France' or 'the French.' The male version of the name in English is Francis. The original Franciscus, meaning "Frenchman", comes from the Franks, originally meaning "free."

Notable people and characters with the name include:

== People known as Frances ==
- Frances, Countess of Périgord (died 1481)
- Frances of Rome (1384–1440), Italian saint, mystic, organizer of charitable services and Benedictine oblate who founded a religious community of oblates
- Frances (musician) (born 1993), British singer and songwriter

== People with the given name ==
- Frances Abington (1737–1815), English actress
- Frances Dorothy Acomb (1907–1984), American historian
- Frances Alda (1879–1952), New Zealand-born, Australian-raised operatic lyric soprano
- Frances Allen (1932–2020), American computer scientist and pioneer in the field of optimizing compilers
- Frances Allitsen (1848–1912), English composer
- Frances Arnold (born 1956), American chemical engineer and Nobel Laureate
- Dame Frances Ashcroft (born 1952), British ion channel physiologist
- Frances Atkins, British chef
- Lady Frances Balfour (1858–1931), British aristocrat, author, and suffragist
- Frances Barkman (1885–1946), Russian-born Australian schoolteacher and Jewish community worker
- Frances Catherine Barnard (1796–1869), English author
- Frances Elizabeth Barrow (1822–1894), American children's writer
- Frances Barth (born 1946), American artist
- Frances Bavier (1902–1989), American stage and television actress
- Frances Estill Beauchamp (1860–1923), American temperance activist, social reformer, lecturer
- Frances Bergen (1922–2006), American actress and fashion model
- Frances Black (born 1960), Irish singer
- Frances Aviva Blane, British abstract painter
- Frances (Fanny) Brawne (1800–1865), fiancée of Romantic poet John Keats
- Frances Egerton, Countess of Bridgewater (May 1583 – 11 March 1636), English noblewoman, art patron and book collector
- Frances Brody, English novelist and playwright
- Frances Brooke (1724–1789), English novelist, essayist, playwright and translator
- Frances Hodgson Burnett (1849–1924), English playwright and author
- Frances Burney (1752–1840), English novelist, diarist and playwright
- Frances E. Burns (1866–1937), American social leader and business executive
- Frances Xavier Cabrini (1850–1917), Italian-American Roman Catholic nun and saint
- Frances Boyd Calhoun (1867–1909), American author
- Frances Manwaring Caulkins (1795–1869), American historian, genealogist, author
- Frances Cavenaugh, American politician
- Frances Burke, Countess of Clanricarde (1567–1633), English noblewoman and Irish countess
- Frances Hyde, Countess of Clarendon (c. 1617–1667), mother-in-law of King James II of England and maternal grandmother of Mary II and Queen Anne
- Frances Bean Cobain (born 1992), American artist, daughter of Nirvana frontman Kurt Cobain and singer Courtney Love
- Frances Newton, Lady Cobham (1539–1592), one of the closest friends of Queen Elizabeth I of England
- Frances Augusta Hemingway Conant (1842–1903), American journalist, editor, businesswoman
- Frances Conroy (born 1953), American actress
- Frances Cornford (1886–1960), English poet
- Frances Lewis Brackett Damon (1857–1939), American poet, writer
- Frances Davidson, Viscountess Davidson (1894–1985), British politician and Member of Parliament
- Frances Dickinson (1856–1945), American physician, clubwoman
- Frances Dodge (1914–1971), American internationally known horsewoman
- Frances Ekstam (1914–2005), American founder of the physical therapy program at Indiana University School of Medicine
- Frances Adler Elkins (1888–1953), interior designer
- Frances Farmer (1913–1970), American actress
- Frances Fisher (born 1952), American actress
- Frances Scott Fitzgerald (1921–1986), American journalist
- Frances FitzGerald (journalist) (born 1940), American journalist and author
- Frances Fitzgerald (politician) (born 1950), Irish Fine Gael politician
- Frances Forbes-Robertson (1866–1956), British novelist
- Frances X. Frei, American academic and businesswoman
- Frances Elizabeth Fryatt, American author, editor, specialist in household applied arts
- Judy Garland (1922-1969), American actress and singer born Frances Ethel Gumm
- Frances Nimmo Greene (1867–1937), American educator and author
- Frances Irene Burge Griswold (1826–1900), American poet, author
- Frances Sarah Guidoboni-Visconti (1804–1883), English socialite in France
- Frances Harshbarger (1902–1987), American mathematician
- Frances Haugen (born 1983 or 1984), American data engineer and scientist, product manager, and whistleblower
- Frances Ridley Havergal (1836–1879), English hymnwriter, religious poet
- Frances Hawkins (1921–2001), American politician and teacher, member of the Nevada State Assembly
- Frances Elizabeth Herring (1851–1916), Canadian journalist and novelist
- Frances Holk-Jones, member of the Alabama House of Representatives
- Frances Anne Hopkins (1838–1919), British painter
- Frances C. Jenkins (1826–1915), American evangelist, Quaker minister, and social reformer
- Frances Benjamin Johnston (1864–1952), American photographer and photojournalist
- Frances Môn Jones (1919–2000), Welsh harpist and teacher
- Frances A. Karnes (1937–2025), American academic and educator
- Frances Kirwan (born 1959), British mathematician
- Frances Shand Kydd (1936–2004), British viscountess, mother of Diana, Princess of Wales
- Frances Lanitou, Cypriot diplomat
- Frances Latham (1610–1677), colonial woman in Rhode Island known as "the Mother of Governors" for having 10 governors among her direct descendants
- Frances Lupton (1821–1892), English reformer for female education
- Frances MacDonald (1873–1921), Scottish artist
- Frances Laughton Mace (1836–1899), American poet
- Frances Harrison Marr (1835–1918), American poet
- Frances McDormand (born 1957), American actress
- Frances Gertrude McGill (1882–1959), pioneering Canadian forensic pathologist and criminologist
- Frances McKee (born 1966), Scottish musician, guitarist for Scottish indie band The Vaselines
- Frances Margaret Milne (1846–1910), Irish-born American writer and librarian
- Frances Trego Montgomery (1858–1925), American children's book writer
- Frances Charlotte Naish (1908–1959), British physician who pioneered aspects of infant health research
- Frances Nelson (1761–1831), wife of Admiral Horatio Nelson
- Frances North (1919–2003), American politician
- Frances Osborne (born 1969), British author
- Frances Perkins (1880–1965), U.S. Secretary of Labor from 1933 to 1945, the longest serving in that position, and the first woman appointed to the U.S. Cabinet
- Frances E. L. Preston (1844–1929), African-American activist
- Frances Folsom Cleveland Preston (1864–1947), wife of US President Grover Cleveland
- Frances Quinlan (born 1986), American musician
- Frances Stewart, Duchess of Richmond (1647–1702), as known as 'La Belle Stuart', the face of Britannia
- Frances Rutherford (1912–2006), New Zealand artist and occupational therapist
- Frances Schreuder (1938–2004), American murderer in the Franklin Bradshaw murder
- Frances Alice Shepherd, Canadian academic
- Frances Simpson (c. 1857–1926), English writer, journalist, cat show judge, and cat breeder
- Frances Carr, Countess of Somerset (1590–1632), central figure in a famous scandal and murder
- Frances Seymour, Duchess of Somerset (1599–1674), English noblewoman
- Frances Lee Strong or Grandma Lee (1934–2020), American comedian
- Frances Grey, Duchess of Suffolk (1517–1559), granddaughter of Henry VII of England and mother of Queen Jane Grey
- Frances T. Sullivan, New York State assemblywoman 1991–2002
- Frances Radclyffe, Countess of Sussex (1531–1589), Lady of the Bedchamber to Queen Elizabeth I
- Frances Sweeney (1908–1944), American journalist and anti-fascist activist
- Frances L. Swift (1837–1916), American church and temperance leader
- Francie Swift (born 1969 or 1970), born Frances Swift, American actress
- Frances Tiafoe (born 1998), American tennis player (male)
- Frances Christine Fisher Tiernan (1846–1920), American novelist and author under the pen name Christian Reid
- Frances E. Townsley (1850–1909), American Baptist minister
- Frances Trollope (1779–1863), English novelist and writer, mother of novelist and writer Anthony Trollope
- Frances Eleanor Trollope (1835–1913), sister of Ellen Ternan (Charles Dickens' mistress) and sister-in-law of Anthony Trollope
- Frances Talbot, Countess of Tyrconnell (c. 1647–1730), English courtier and Irish countess
- Frances Vane, Viscountess Vane (1715–1788), British memoirist known for her highly public adulterous relationships
- Frances Waldegrave (1821–1879), Countess Waldegrave, British heiress and society hostess
- Frances Wessells (1919–2024), American dancer, choreographer, and associate professor
- Frances Willard (1839–1898), American educator, temperance reformer and women's suffragist
- Frances Williams (disambiguation), multiple people
- Frances Yip (born 1947), Hong Kong singer

== Fictional characters ==
- Frances, in the anime Sonic X
- Frances Badger, the title character in the children's book series by Russell Hoban
- Frances Buffay, Phoebe Buffay's adoptive grandmother in NBC sitcom Friends
- Frances Earnshaw, from the novel Wuthering Heights
- Frances the Firefly, the protagonist in a fire safety public information film
- Frances Flynn, the protagonist of the novel Conversations with Friends, played by Alison Oliver in the TV adaptation of the same name
- Frances "Frankie" Foster, from the 2004 Cartoon Network series Foster's Home for Imaginary Friends
- Frances "Franny" Glass, from Franny and Zooey
- Frances Ha, the title character, played by Greta Gerwig, in the 2012 American black and white comedy-drama film, Frances Ha
- Frances "Frankie" Heck, played by Patricia Heaton on the ABC sitcom The Middle
- Frances "Baby" Houseman (portrayed by Jennifer Grey), from the movie Dirty Dancing
- Mary Frances "Francie" Nolan, from A Tree Grows in Brooklyn by Betty Smith
- Frances Stevens, played by Grace Kelly in Hitchcock's To Catch a Thief

== See also ==
- Francie
- Francis
- Frannie
