= Frannie =

Frannie is a given name. It is generally a feminine name used as a nickname for Frances. The masculine form is Franny. Notable people with the name include:

== Women ==
- Frannie Boyd (1867–1909), American writer and teacher
- Frannie Crouse (born 1995), American soccer player
- Frannie Golde, American musician and writer
- Frannie Léautier, Tanzanian civil engineer
- Frannie Lindsay, American poet
- Frannie Peabody (1903–2001), HIV/AIDS activist

== Men ==
- Frannie Collin (born 1987), English professional footballer
- Frannie Jarvis (born 1950), British professional rugby league footballer
- Frannie Matthews (1916–1999), American baseball player

== Fiction ==
- Frannie Hughes, fictional character on the soap opera As the World Turns

== See also ==
- Francie
