= Edith F. Butler =

American artist and illustrator

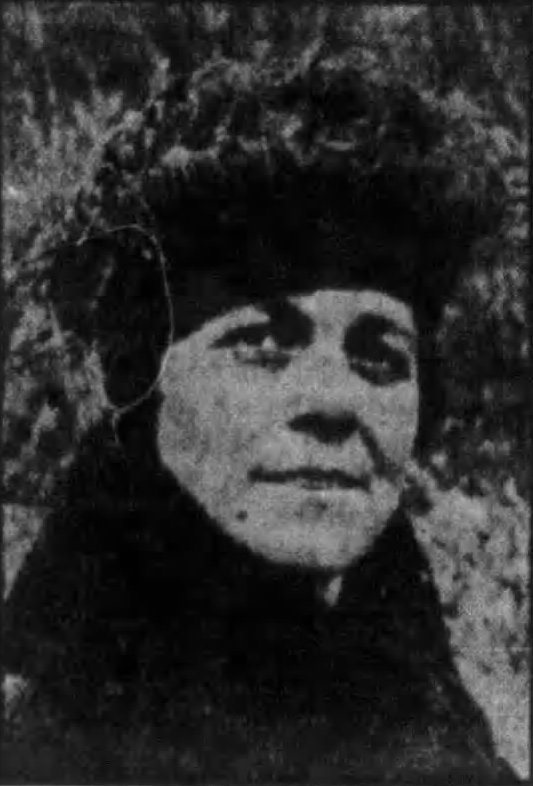
- Edith F. Butler in 1919
- Born: Edith May Folkins; September 16, 1888; Lynn, Massachusetts
- Died: August 28, 1975 (aged 86); Rockland, Massachusetts

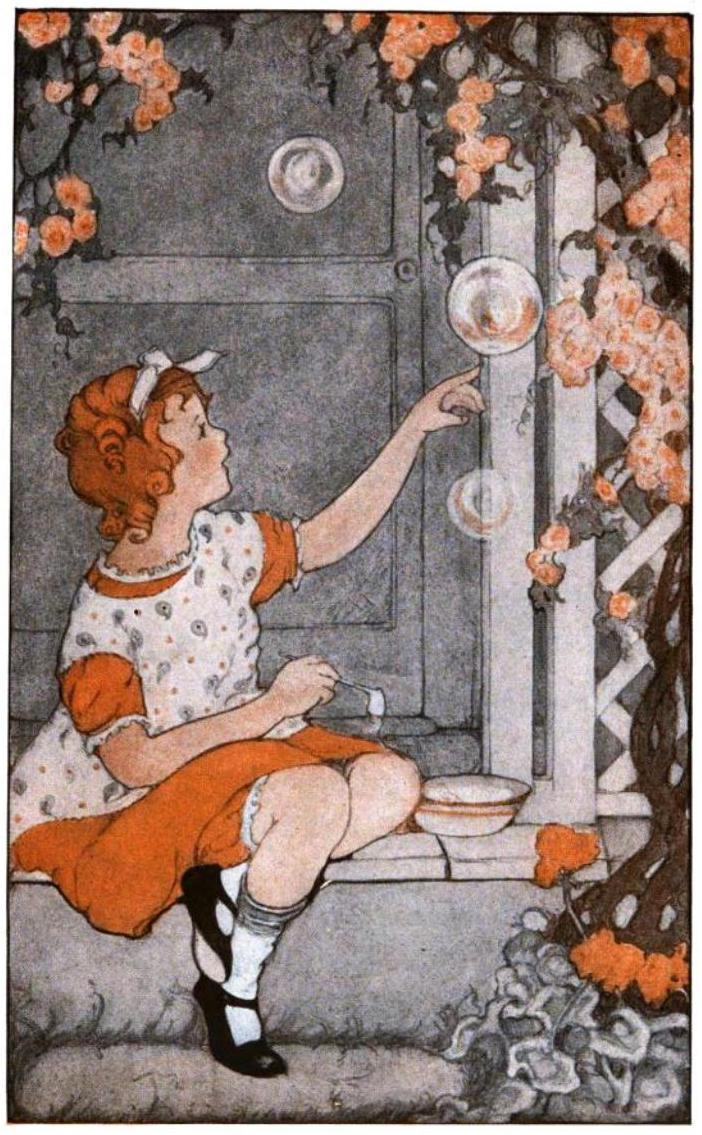
Illustration by Edith F. Butler from the book, Wee Ann (1919)

Edith F. Butler was an American artist and illustrator, mainly of children's books, magazines, and advertisements.

== Biography ==
Edith May Folkins or Falkins (Note: Lynn birth and marriage records list her name as "Folkins". However, some records, including childhood census records and obituaries of her and her family members, list it a "Falkins"; Folkins is used here for consistency.) was born in Lynn, Massachusetts on September 16, 1888. Her parents were Victoria A. and William G. Folkins, and her brothers were Chester and Franklin. She grew up in Lynn and attended schools in the town. She eventually attended the Massachusetts School of Art, where she studied under Richard Andrew and Vesper George.

In 1909, she married Frank Addison Butler. After her marriage, she and her husband moved to Swampscott, Massachusetts, where she continued to live for the majority of her life. In 1911, they had a son, Richard, and she took a step back from art.

Butler went back to art and then took it up professionally around 1917. Her illustrations began to be published in magazines, including the American magazine, Little Folks, and Woman's Home Companion. She also worked as a children's book illustrator, and drew accompanying art for the book Wee Ann. One of Butler's illustration subjects was children, especially those under 10 years old, and she drew their lives and activities outdoors. Her son, Richard, was an inspiration for much of her artwork, especially her illustrations for books published by David C. Cook.

Butler illustrated educational books, including the second educational basal reader in the series, Stone's Silent Reading (c. 1925), and the Bolenius Fourth Reader (revised, c. 1929) by Emma Miller Bolenius, which she co-illustrated with Mabel B. Hill. She created illustrations for advertisements as well, including for Kalburnie Gingham.

By the 1950s, Butler had retired from her children's book career. Her art became a hobby, and she took up various crafts that were instead shared with friends and family, including lino printing and rug-making.

Butler's husband died in 1961. After living in Swampscott for 65 years, she then moved in with her son in Whitman, Massachusetts in 1969. She died in a nursing home in Rockland, Massachusetts, after a long illness, on August 28, 1975. She was 86 years old.

== Works ==
- Wee Ann (1919), written by Ethel Calvert Phillips
- Little Friend Lydia (c. 1920), written by Ethel Calvert Phillips
- Pretty Polly Perkins (c. 1925), written by Ethel Calvert Phillips
- Stone's Silent Reading, book two (c. 1925)
- Little Sallie Waters (1926), written by Ethel Calvert Phillips
- Bolenius Fourth Reader (revised, c. 1929) written by Emma Miller Bolenius, co-illustrated by Mabel B. Hill.
