= Violet Moore Higgins =

American cartoonist, children's book illustrator, and writer (1886–1967)

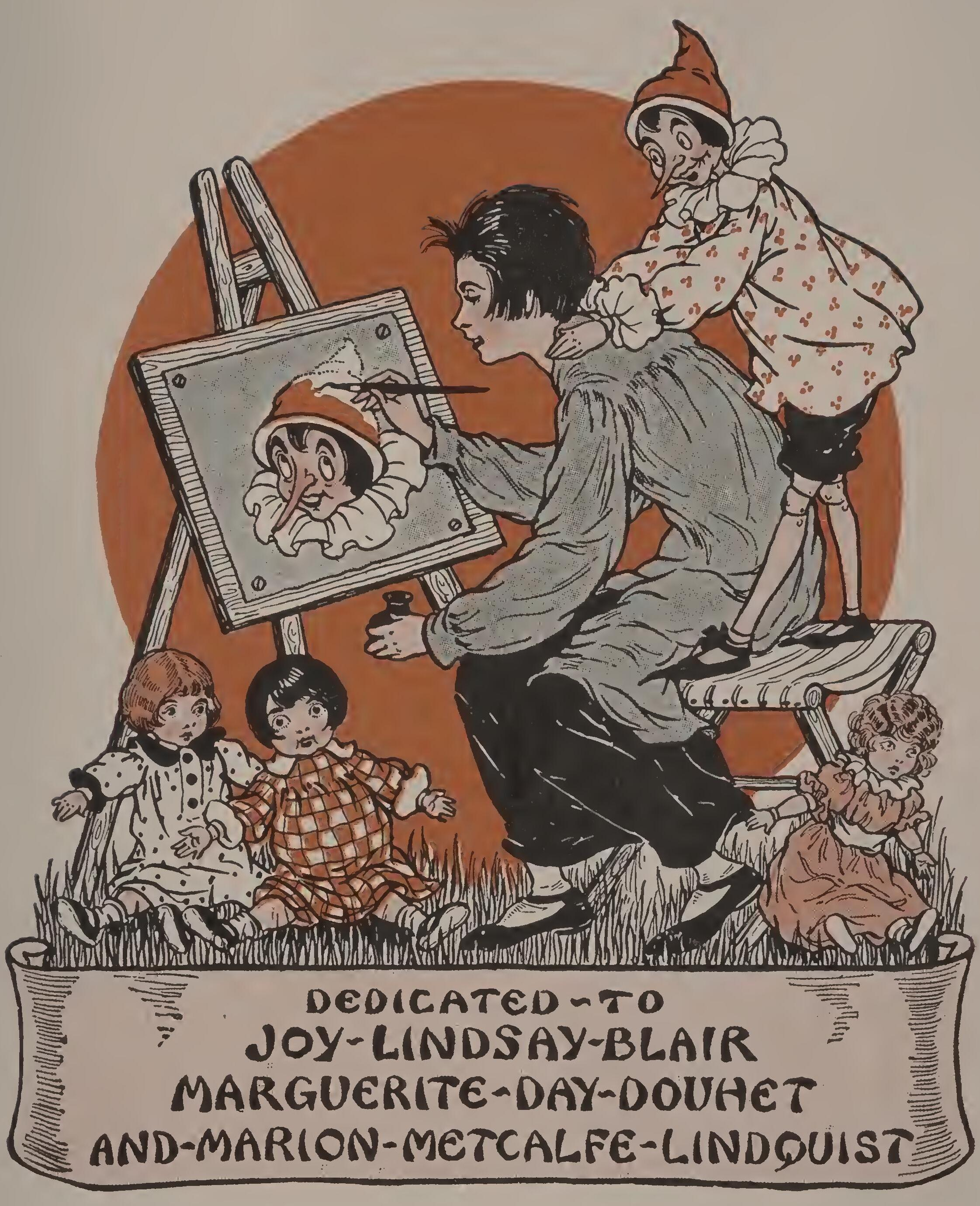
- Self-portrait of Violet Moore Higgins, from Pinocchio: The Story of a Puppet (1926)
- Born: Violet Idelle Moore; November 28, 1886; Elgin, Illinois
- Died: July 28, 1967 (aged 80); New York City
- Spouse: Edward Robert Higgins

Violet Moore Higgins (November 28, 1886 – July 28, 1967), who also published under her birth name Violet Moore, was an American cartoonist, children's book illustrator, and writer.

== Life and career ==
Violet Idelle Moore was born in Elgin, Illinois on November 28, 1886. She graduated from Elgin High School, a public high school, in 1905. In the early 1900s, she attended the Art Institute of Chicago.

In 1910, she married artist Edward Robert Higgins, who was an art director for the Newspaper Enterprise Artists Services (NEA) of Scripps-Howard. They had a son, Lindley Roberts Higgins. They had a daughter named Mary Elizabeth Higgins in 1912, who died at one year old in 1913.

In 1913, Higgins painted a cover for the Saturday Evening Post that focused on the United States women's suffrage movement. Around the mid-1910s, she created a series of books for the Whitman Publishing Co. under the name "Story Time Tales". The books contained retellings of traditional stories from different areas of the world.

By the 1920s, Higgins worked for newspapers as a journalist. She interviewed and wrote articles about celebrities, and wrote and illustrated for the NEA along with her husband.

Higgins was also the illustrator of the comic strip "Drowsy Dick", first published in the Sunday World. The comic was originally illustrated by Ernest J. King, but after less than a month, the strip was taken over by Higgins. Her first comic of "Drowsy Dick" was published on October 10, 1926. The cartoon was later dropped from the newspaper when they lowered their number of comic pages. In the 1920s, after readers asked about the comic's absence, the comic was brought back and published in the New York World. Between 1946 and 1947, she additionally was an illustrator for the comic book, Treasure Chest.

From 1954 to 1963, she was a feature writer and illustrator for the Associated Press, with an illustrated children's feature named "Junior Editors". "Junior Editors" started in 1954 and was meant to capture children's attention during the competing rise of magazines and television. The feature ran six times a week and included text and a do-it-yourself section for children.

Higgins died at age 80 on July 28, 1967, in New York City. At the time of her death, she lived in The Bronx.

== Gallery ==
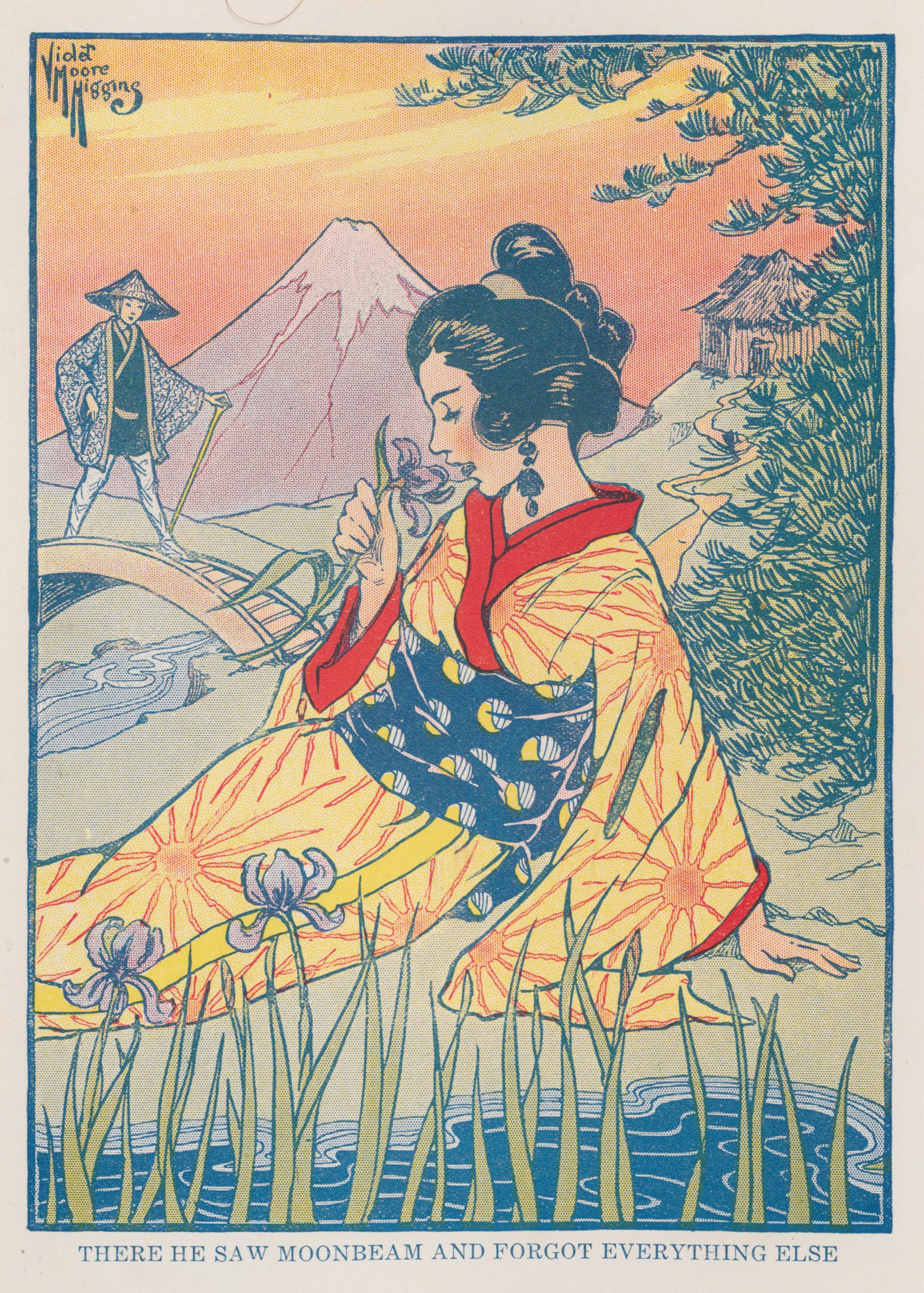
Illustration from The Silver Ship and Other Japanese Tales Retold

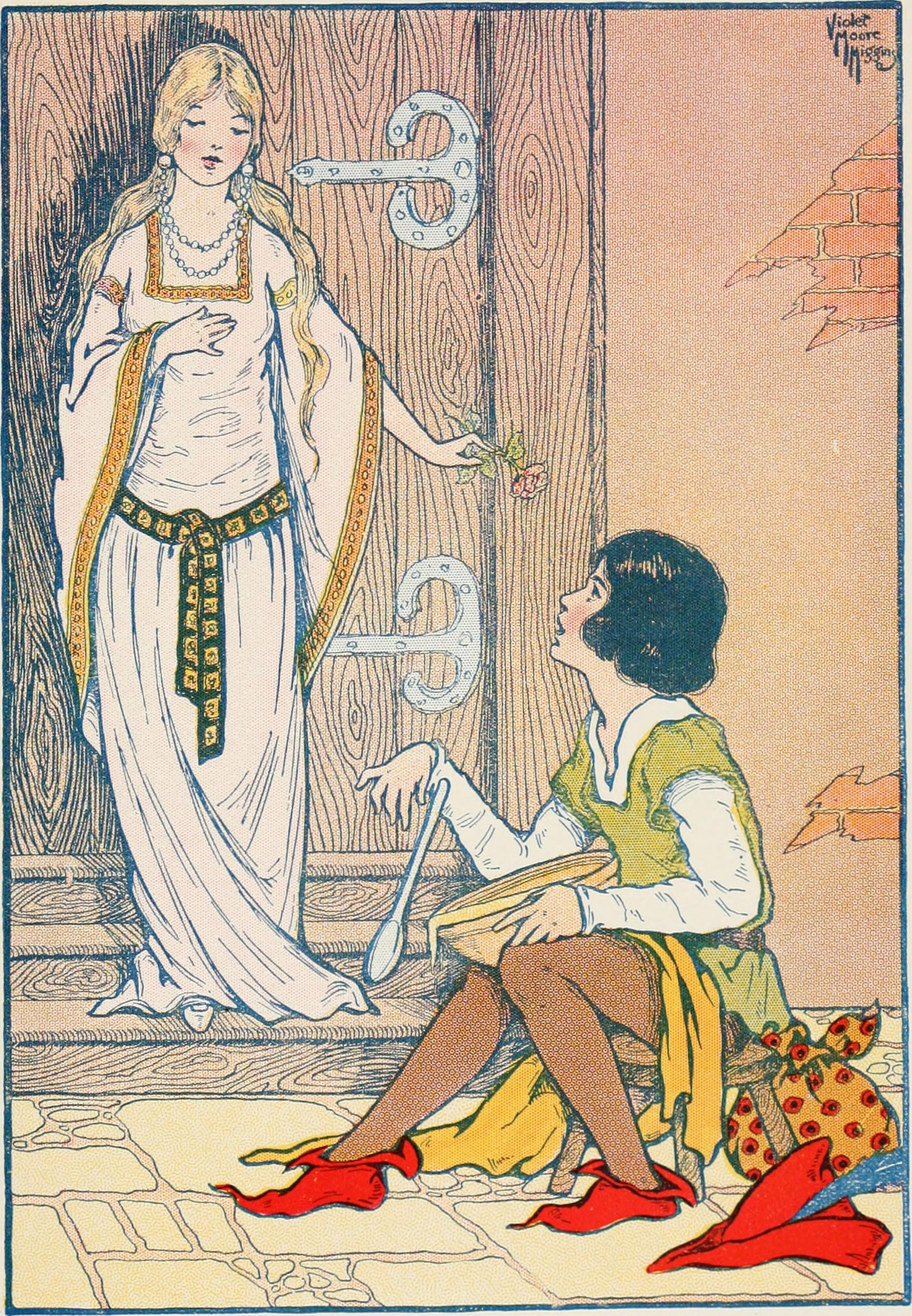
Illustration from The woodcutter's son, and other English tales retold (1917)

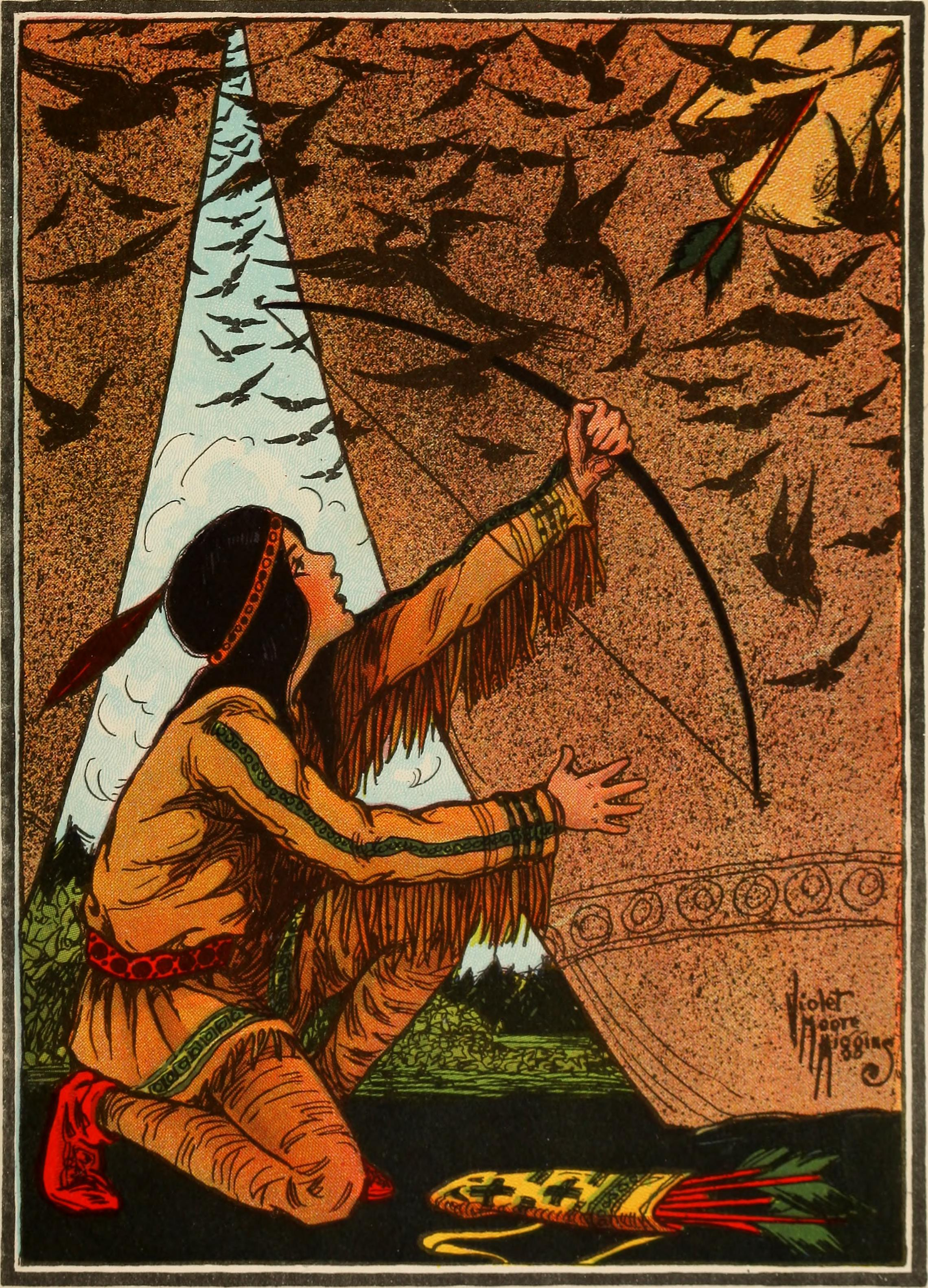
Illustration from The lost giant and other American Indian tales retold (1918)

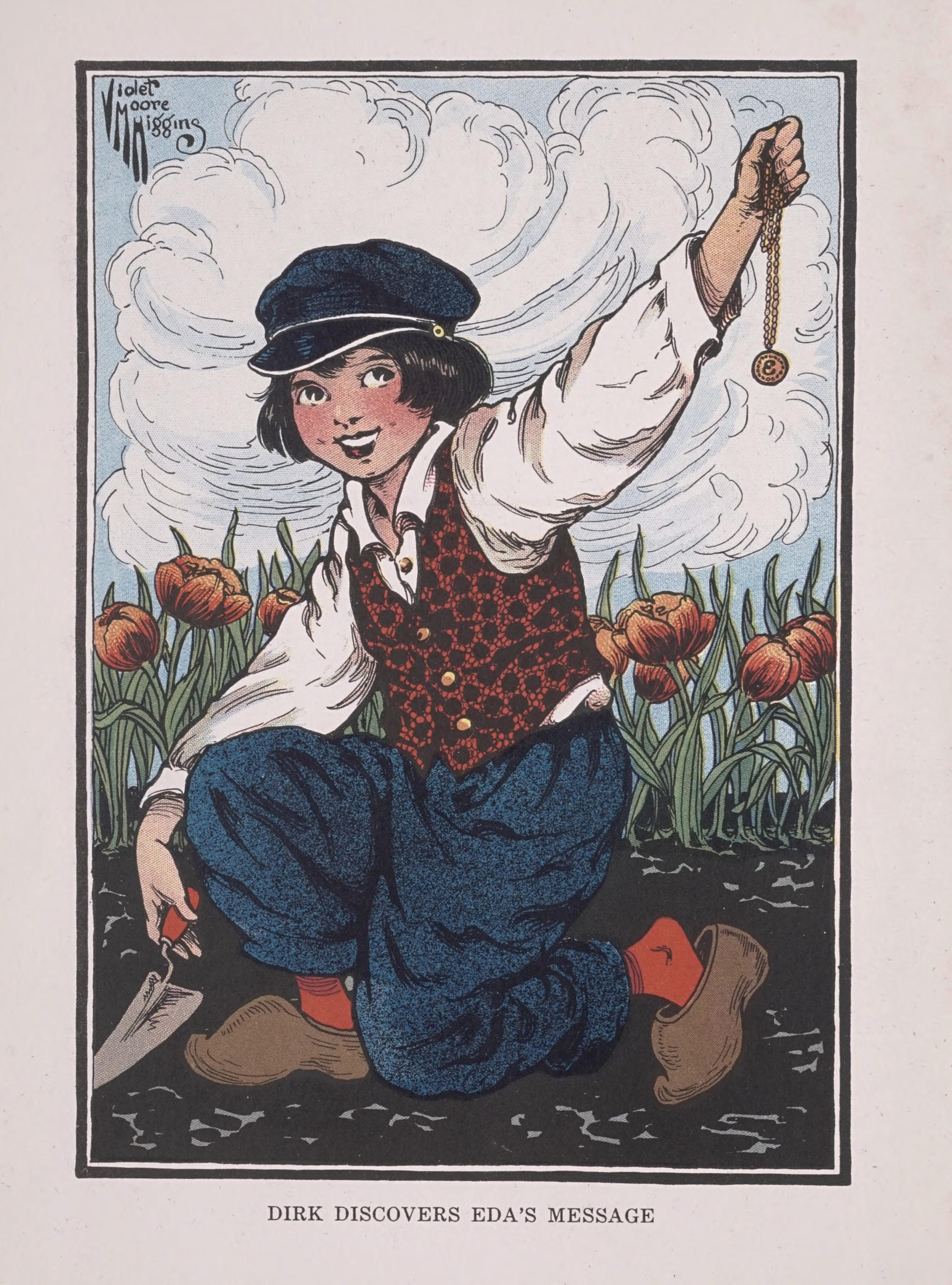
Frontispiece from The Carved Shoes: And Other Holland Tales (1919)

== Works ==
- Picture Puzzle Nursery Rhymes (1917)
- The Real Story of a Real Doll (1929)
- The Gingerbread Man

=== Story Time Tales ===
- The Endless Story and Other Oriental Tales Retold (1916)
- The Little Juggler and Other French Tales Retold (1917)
- The Silver Ship and Other Japanese Tales Retold (1917)
- The Woodcutter's Son and Other Old English Tales Retold (1917)
- The Lost Giant and Other American Indian Tales Retold (1918)
- The Carved Shoes and Other Holland Tales (c. 1918)

=== Illustrations ===
- Zip: The Adventures of a Frisky Fox Terrier (c. 1917) by Frances Trego Montgomery
- Delightful Stories for Children (1920) by Elizabeth Billings Stuart; illustrated by Higgins and C. M. Burd
- Children's Games for all Seasons (c. 1921) by Teresa M. Bruck; illustrated by Higgins and C. M. Burd
- Good-Night Stories (c. 1921) by Laura Rountree Smith; illustrated by Higgins and C. M. Burd
- Heidi (c. 1924) by Johanna Heusser Spyri; translation by Mabel Abbott
- Homespun Stories: The Wonder Book of Fanciful Tales (c. 1924) by Clara Janetta Fort Denton
- East O' the Sun and West O' the Moon With Other Norwegian Folk Tales (c. 1924) by Peter Christen Asbjornsen and Jorgen Engebretsen Moe; retelling by Inger Margrete Rasmussen
- The Open Door Primer and The Open Door First Reader (1926) by Elma A. Neal
- Pinocchio: The Story of a Puppet (c. 1926) by Carlo Collodi; edited by Higgins
- The Story-A-Day Book (1927) by Nelle A. Holt
- Denton's Fanciful Tales: Homespun and Cozy Corner Stories (c. 1927) by Clara Janetta Fort Denton; illustrated by Higgins and J. T. Cochran
- The Little Lame Prince (c. 1927) by Dinah Maria Mulock Craik
- The Dawn of Faith: A Story of Young Missionaries and Pirates in Tripoli (c. 1928) by Zelia Margaret Walters
- Hans Brinker: Or, The Silver Skates (1929 edition), written by Mary Mapes Dodge in 1865
- The Singing Twins (1930) by Laura Rountree Smith
- Our Book World: In the Workshop (c. 1931) by Florence Piper Tuttle; illustrated by Higgins and Mabel Betsy Hill
- What Happened After by Patten Beard
