= Frances Preston =

Frances Preston may refer to:

- Frances W. Preston (1928–2012), American music executive
- Frances E. L. Preston (1844–1929), organizer and lecturer for the National Women’s Christian Temperance Union

== See also ==
- Frances Campbell-Preston (1918–2022), British courtier
- Francis Preston (1765–1835), American lawyer and politician
- Francis Preston (sailor), British Olympic sailor
