= Franny =

Franny is a given name. It is generally a masculine name used as a nickname for Francis. The feminine form is Frannie. Notable people with the name include:

== Men ==
- Franny Beecher (1921–2014), American guitarist
- Franny Eriguel (1959–2018), Filipino medical doctor and politician
- Franny Firth (1956–2018), English footballer
- Franny Griffiths (born 1966), English keyboardist, producer and remixer
- Franny Jarvis (born 1950), British professional rugby league footballer
- Franny Jeffers (born 1981), English football coach and player
- Franny Lee (1944–2023), English professional footballer and businessman
- Franny McManimon (1926–2020), American politician
- Franny Murray (1915–1998), American football halfback and punter
- Franny Powell (born 1977), English footballer

== Women ==
- Franny Armstrong (born 1972), British documentary film director
- Franny Battistelli (born 1985), American Christian singer and songwriter
- Franny Billingsley (born 1954), American children's fantasy novelist
- Franny Černá (born 1997), Czech professional footballer
- Franny Choi (born 1989), American writer, poet and playwright
- Franny McLaughlin (1919–2014), American photographer
- Franny Moyle (born 1964), British television producer and author
- Franny Reese (1917–2003), American environmentalist

== Fiction ==
- Franny Fantootsie, a character from the TV series Franny's Feet
- Franny Glass, a character from the Franny and Zooey
- Franny Rios, a character from The Nine (TV series)
- Franny Robinson, a character from the 2007 Disney film Meet the Robinsons
- Franny Stein, a character from the children's book series Franny K. Stein
- Franny Watts, a character from The Benefactor (2015 film)

== See also ==
- The Benefactor (2015 film), an American drama film with the working title Franny
- "Franny", a short story from Franny and Zooey
