= Frances Wessells =

American dancer (1919–2024)

- Born: Frances Ann Davies; August 18, 1919; Colorado, U.S.
- Died: December 31, 2024 (aged 105)
- Education: University of Denver (BA); New York University (MA)
- Occupations: Dancer, choreographer, journalist, professor, company founder
- Years active: 1992–2019
- Spouses: John Wessells (died 1988); John Bailey (died 2019)
- Children: 3

Frances Ann Wessells (née Davies; August 18, 1919 – December 31, 2024) was an American dancer, choreographer, and Associate Professor Emerita who was the founder of the dance department at Virginia Commonwealth University (VCU). She helped form the department of dance at VCU and was still teaching and dancing professionally in her late nineties.

== Early life ==
Wessells was born Frances Ann Davis on August 18, 1919, into a family of professional musicians whose careers derailed with the demise of vaudeville and the coming of talkies. Her father worked for the Denver sanitation department.

== Career ==
=== Art criticism ===
In her writing as a dance critic for the Richmond Times-Dispatch, Wessells reviewed many dance troupes and star performers, such as Lorry May of the Sokolow Dance Foundation. For 25 years she was the dance critic for the Richmond Times-Dispatch.

=== Education and teaching career ===
Wessells received a Bachelor of Arts degree from the University of Denver and a Master of Arts from New York University. She taught at Sweet Briar College for three years. She was on the dance faculty at the University of Richmond for 25 years and at VCU for 30 years.

In 2003, Wessells and Robbie Kinter performed for students of geriatric medicine in the medical school of St. Louis University. Dancer Chris Burnside, who taught at University of California, Los Angeles and served as Chair of the Department of Dance and Choreography and Assistant Dean of Student Affairs in the VCU School of the Arts, began his career studying and dancing with Wessells at VCU.

In 2016, at its annual Artsie Awards gala at Virginia Repertory Theatre's November Theatre, with local acting/singing star Desirée Roots hosting, the Richmond Theater Critics Circle awarded Wessells the Liz Marks Memorial Award for Ongoing Contribution to Richmond Area Theater for her significant long-term contributions to the Richmond Art Community as a VCU professor of dance performance, choreography, and history. Wessells received the award along with Marie Goodman Hunter, an "African-American actor, singer and educator who helped break down racial barriers in teaching and performance in central Virginia."

=== Dance performer ===
One of Wessells's earliest teachers was Hanya Holm. She performed in the Latin Ballet of Virginia's 2016 production of The Legend of the Poinsettia. Her nomination for an Artsie award was announced in 2016 by the Richmond Times-Dispatch. Many of her performances have been demonstrations of the healthful importance of agility and strength gained from dancing at any age. She has frequently performed with Robbie Kinter. Wessells and Kinter performed Marda in 2008 at the Carpenter Center in Richmond, and, in 2012, they participated together in the 10th Annual Richmond Choreographers Showcase produced by Starr Foster Dance Project at the Grace Street Theatre in Richmond. Kinter choreographed Them, which was performed with Wessells at the Choreographers Showcase at the Clarice Smith Performing Arts Center, University of Maryland.

Wessells performed in March 2011 at Paris' Théâtre National de Chaillot. Jason Akira Somma, her 31-year-old dance partner, confirmed that the last of her three performances in Paris brought the audience to tears.

=== Exhibitions ===
Wessells was a member of Artspace in Richmond, Virginia and an exhibitor at art6. She showed glass works in ThinkSmall3 sponsored by Artspace and art6. In 2001, she exhibited stone and clay sculpture at Artspace. In 2005, she participated in Fluxus/Redux at art6. She was a model for a Susan Singer show of female nudes Not Barbie: A Celebration of Real Women, which represented stories of "birth, aging, pregnancy, middle age, scars, body modifications, and many other topics."

== Personal life and death ==
Wessells was married for 44 years to John Howard Wessells Jr., a speechwriter and friend to a succession of Virginia governors. The couple met in Colorado, when both were singing in a church choir. They had three sons before John Wessells' death in 1988. She remarried to John Bailey, a dancer, painter, and choreographer, who had been one of her students; they moved to Crozier, Virginia. He died in 2019.

Wessells turned 100 on August 18, 2019, and died on December 31, 2024, at the age of 105.
