= Geertruida van Vladeracken =

Dutch singer and composer (1880–1947)

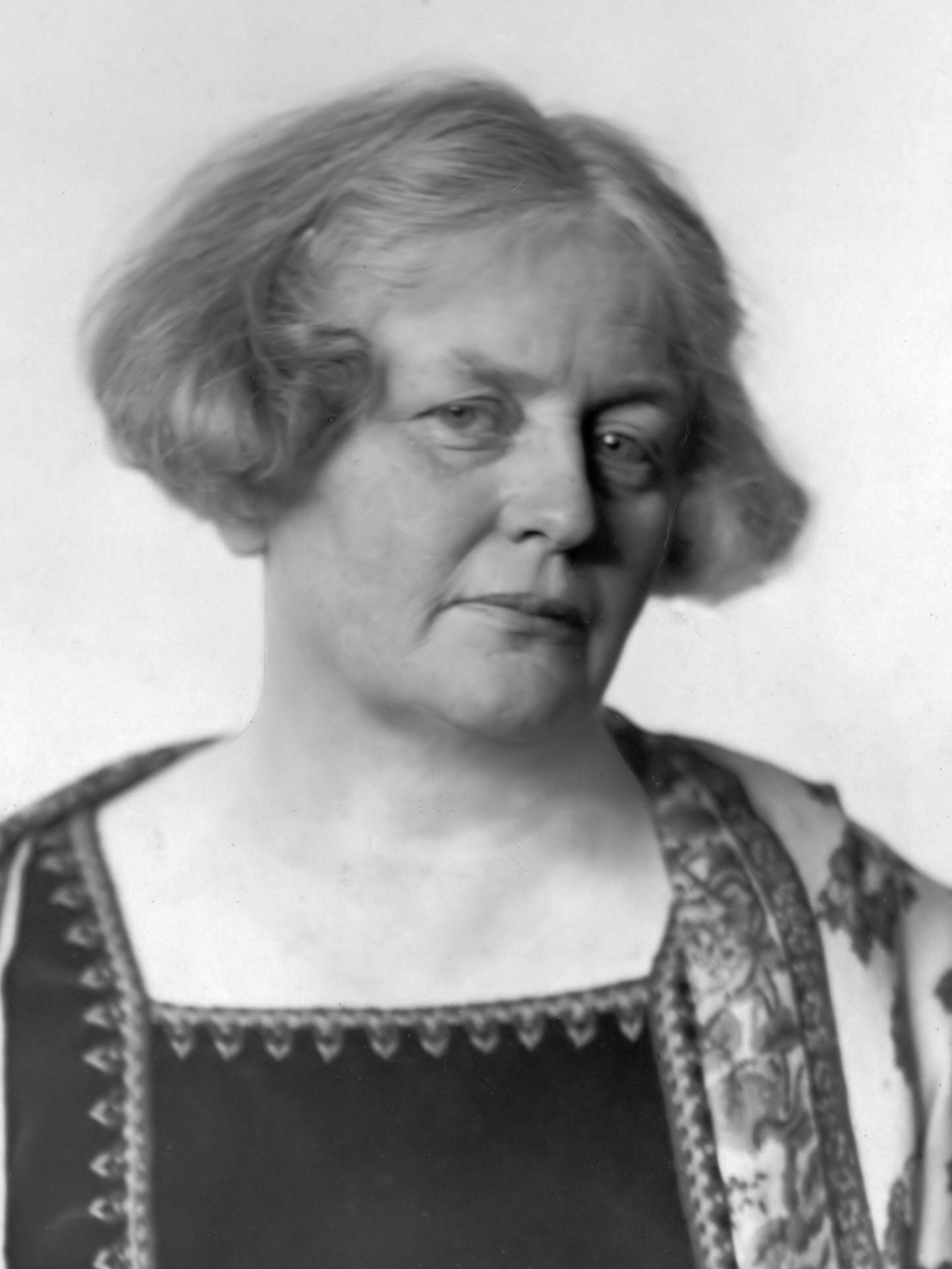
Geertruida van Vladeracken (1931)

Geertruida van Vladeracken (18 April 1880 – 2 January 1947) was a Dutch composer, singer, and writer.

Vladeracken was born in Haarlem to Gerard Pieter van Vladeracken and Jacoba Elisabeth Foreest van Vladeracken. She had three siblings. She studied music at the Conservatorium van Amsterdam with Bernard Zweers and Anton Tierie. Vladeracken married the lawyer and composer Nicolaas Cornelis Vogel in 1901. After his death, she married the artist and pianist Jan Poortenaar in 1916.

Vladeracken gave frequent vocal recitals throughout Europe and America, accompanied by Poortenaar on piano. This enabled Poortenaar to exhibit his art in many cities where he is now represented in museums. From 1922 to 1924, the couple toured Indonesia, where they presented recitals and Poortenaar painted. They wrote a book about this trip entitled Een kunstreis in de Tropen (An Artist in Java and Other Islands of Indonesia).

Vladeracken's musical manuscripts are archived in the Netherlands Music Institute. Her music was published by Alsbach and Broekmans & van Poppel under the name "Geertruida Vladeracken."

Vladeracken's publications include:

== Books ==
- Beter Zingen (Sing Better)
- Een kunstreis in de Tropen (An Artist in Java and Other Islands of Indonesia; with Jan Poortenaar)
- Het klavier bij Bach en zijn tijdgenooten (Bach's Keyboard)
- Om de kribbe : een kerstboekje (Around the Manger: A Christmas Book)
- Op de straat (On the Street; with Jan Poortenaar)
- Sand Men (illustrated by Johanna Frederika Langeler)
- Stuivertje wisselen (Change Penny; illustrated by Nans van Leeuwen)
- Who Else Reads to Me? (illustrated by Nans van Leeuwen)

== Operetta ==
- De Koningsdeuze (King's Choice)
- De Sneeuwmannetjes (Snowmen)
- De Tooverbal (Magic Ball)
- Goudhaartje en de Troubadour (Goldilocks and the Troubadour)

== Vocal ==
- "Ave Virgo" (Virgo Bird; soprano, violin and piano)
- Bloemencantate (Flower Cantata)
- "Doll Songs" (voice and piano)
- "Lenteliedjes" (Spring Songs; voice and piano; illustrated by Rie Cramer)
- Ons nieuwe Sinterklaasboek : zeven liedjes en vier verhalen (Our New St. Nicholas Book: Seven Songs and Four Stories; with A. Zurcher-Groenveld and Jan Poortenaar)
- "Plange Sion" (Cry of Zion; voice and organ)
