= Emma Miller =

Emma Miller may refer to:

- Emma Miller (suffragist) (1839–1917), Australian trade union leader and suffragist
- Emma Guffey Miller (1874–1970), American feminist activist
- Emma Miller Bolenius (1876–1968), American educator
