= Nans van Leeuwen =

Dutch illustrator and author of children's books

- Born: Ferdinanda Emilia van Leeuwen; 23 December 1900; Amsterdam, Netherlands
- Died: 1 January 1995 (aged 94); Rotterdam, Netherlands
- Education: Rijksakademie van beeldende kunsten
- Known for: Children's book illustrations
- Notable work: "Piggelmee" books

Nans van Leeuwen (23 December 1900 – 1 January 1995) was a prolific Dutch illustrator and author of children's books.

== Life ==
Ferdinanda Emilia 'Nans' van Leeuwen was born in Amsterdam, the daughter of Klaas van Leeuwen, a painter and teacher. She graduated from the Rijksakademie van beeldende kunsten (State Academy of Fine Arts) in Amsterdam in 1922. She moved to Rotterdam, where she taught at a girls' school from 1922 to 1962.

She began illustrating children's books in the 1920s for other authors, and she eventually began to write and illustrate her own books. She is best known as the illustrator of a series of children's books featuring a goblin named Piggelmee that were published as a form of advertising by the Van Nelle coffee company in the 1930s and 1940s. The first of the Piggelmee books, Het tovervisje (Witchcraft, 1949), was based on a story by the Brothers Grimm. Following this came De wonderschelp (The Wonder Shells, 1950), which was written in verse, and De Baas van Bos en Duin (The Boss of Forest and Dune, 1951).

Her career spanned three decades, with her last work being published in the late 1950s. Her style ranged from one that was strongly linear and akin to that of illustrators such as Maginel Wright Enright, Rie Cramer, and Mabel Betsy Hill to a softer style built on color washes.

== Illustrated works ==
=== Written by van Leeuwen ===
- Sneeuwpret (Snow Fun)
- Sinterklaas is jarig (Sinter Klaas is a Year Old)
- Schoonmaak bij de muisjes (Cleaning at the Mouse House)
- De muizen gaan verhuizen! (The Mice Are Moving!)
- De sneeuwman van Jaap en Jetje (The Snowmen of Jaap and Jetje)
- Lotje in luilekkerland (Lotje in Good Luck Land)
- Het verdwaalde eendje (The Lost Duckling)
- Het feest van de tuinkabouter (The Gardener's Party)
- A Rainy Day (1950)
- Moeder Muis houdt grote schoonmaak (published in English as Spring Cleaning with Mrs. Mouse, 1950)

=== Written by other authors ===
- Bobtail's Adventure by Maggy Larissa (1963)
- Change Penny by Geertruida Vladeracken
- Die kinderen van de grote fjeld (The Children of the Great Mountain) by Laura Fitinghoff
- Die toverende tweeling (The Devout Twins) by Tiny Broekman (1958)
- Pussy-cat School by Maggy Larissa (1963)
- The Animal Ski School by Maggy Larissa (1963)
- The Happy Gnomes by Maggy Larissa (1963)
- The Naughty Clown by Maggy Larissa (1963)
- The Naughty Harlequin by Maggy Larissa (1963)
- The Nightingale by Maggy Larissa (1965)
- The Toy Bear's Train by Maggy Larissa (1963)
- The Woman in the Moon by Maggy Larissa (1963)
- The Goblin Party (1963)
- The Happy Tale of Monty Mouse (1969)
- Who Else Reads to Me? by Geertruida Vladeracken
