= Fryatt =

Fryatt is a surname. Notable people with the surname include:

- Charles Fryatt (1872–1916), British mariner executed in WWI
- Frances Elizabeth Fryatt (?–?), American author, editor, specialist in household applied arts
- Jim Fryatt (born 1940), English footballer
- Matty Fryatt (born 1986), English footballer
