= Frances Herring =

Frances Herring may refer to:

- Frances W. Herring, professor of government at University of California, Berkeley
- Frances Elizabeth Herring, Canadian journalist and novelist

== See also ==
- Francis Herring, English physician and writer
