= The Black Rider =

Musical play

- The Casting of the Magic Bullets
- Canadian Tour Program
- Music: Tom Waits
- Lyrics: Tom Waits
- Book: William S. Burroughs
- Basis: "The Fatal Marksman" by Johann August Apel
- Productions: 1990 Hamburg; 1998 Betty Nansen Teatret; 1998 Edmonton International Fringe Festival; 1998 Det Norske Teatret; 1999 New York International Fringe Festival; 2005 American Conservatory Theater, San Francisco; 2008 November Theatre; 2009 Barcelona; 2012 Schaubühne; 2015 Betty Nansen Teatret 2017 Melbourne Festival; 2018 Theater Regensburg; 2019 Theater Koblenz; 2024 Lahti city theater 2025 Divadlo Komedie; 2026 Volkstheater Rostock

The Black Rider: The Casting of the Magic Bullets is a self-billed "musical fable" in the avant-garde tradition created through the collaboration of theatre director Robert Wilson, musician Tom Waits and writer William S. Burroughs. Wilson, in the original production, was largely responsible for the design and direction. Burroughs wrote the book, while Waits wrote the music and most of the lyrics. The project began in about 1988 when Wilson approached Waits. The story is based on "The Fatal Marksman" by Johann August Apel and the German Freischütz motif, which had previously been adapted as an opera by Carl Maria von Weber. The Black Rider premiered at Hamburg's Thalia Theatre on 31 March 1990, and was performed at Paris's Théâtre du Châtelet on 9 October 1990. November Theatre produced its world English-language premiere in 1998 at the Edmonton International Fringe Festival in Canada. Det Norske Teatret in Oslo staged a Norwegian (Nynorsk) version in 1998, with Lasse Kolsrud as Pegleg. Only the dialogue was translated by the dramaturg and key collaborator of the entire creative process, Wolfgang Wiens; the songs were performed in English.

Waits recorded much of the music from the play in different arrangements as The Black Rider.

== Synopsis ==
Wilhelm, a file clerk, falls in love with a huntsman's daughter. In order to marry, Wilhelm must prove his worth as a hunter and gain her father's approval, but, as "a man of pen and ink," his shot is lousy and his hopes of marriage worsen. He is offered magic bullets by the devil, Pegleg – who assures him that his bullets will always have a sure shot. However, Pegleg stipulates that, while most of the bullets will hit anything Wilhelm pleases, one of the bullets is under Pegleg's control. Foolish, naive, and overrun with desperate hope, Wilhelm accepts the Faustian pact. On the day of Wilhelm's wedding, the final bullet strikes his beloved dead. He then goes mad, and joins the previous victims of Satan's cunning in the Devil's carnival.

Although based on folklore, the story contains strong autobiographical elements from Burroughs' own life: he shot and killed his own wife in a drunken attempt at recreating the William Tell legend, and the story as a whole may be construed as a warning tale about the destructive powers of addiction.

== Music ==
The music was composed and performed by Tom Waits, and released as a record in 1993.

== Productions ==
November Theatre produced its world English-language premiere in 1998 at the Edmonton International Fringe Festival in Canada, and the American English-language premiere at the New York International Fringe Festival in 1999.

The play premiered in Finnish in October 1998 by the Helsinki City Theatre, translated by Markku Salo, directed by Anneli Mäkelä, with a live Devil's Rubato Band.

In 2004, UK producers Cultural Industry, London, Barbican Arts Centre, American Conservatory Theater, and the Sydney Festival, Australia, teamed together with Wilson and Waits to produce a touring production in English. Based heavily on the 1990 Thalia theatre production, and even containing some members of the original cast, it toured the world starting in London. The part of Pegleg was played by singer Marianne Faithfull, while Wilhelm was played by actor Matt McGrath. The remaining cast included Mary Margaret O'Hara, Soňa Červená, Richard Strange, Nigel Richards, Dean Robinson, Jack Willis, Janet Henfrey, Monica Tahal, Gabriella Santinelli and Jake Thornton.

The band, The Magic Bullets, was headed by Bent Clausen and David Coulter and featured Thomas Bloch, Terry Edwards, Caroline Hall, Jack Pinter, Rory McFarlane, and Kate St. John.

The show opened in May 2004 at London's Barbican Arts Centre, and then transferred to San Francisco's American Conservatory Theater later that year. In January 2005, the production headlined the Sydney Festival. However, due to ill health, Marianne Faithfull was forced to withdraw from the production and understudy Nigel Richards filled the part.

November Theatre's production went on to tour Canada in 2004–2005 with presentations at Theatre Network in Edmonton, Ground Zero Theatre and the Calgary Opera, Persephone Theatre in Saskatoon, Yukon Arts Centre in Whitehorse, Intrepid Theatre in Victoria, and the PuSh International Performing Arts Festival in Vancouver. The production received six Elizabeth Sterling Haynes Awards in Edmonton and six Betty Mitchell Awards in Calgary including "Best Production" and "Best Direction" in both major centres. In 2006 the production was presented at the Magnetic North Theatre Festival in St. John's, Newfoundland. The production was remounted in Vancouver in January 2008 at the Arts Club Theatre, Granville Island stage, co-presented as part of the annual PuSh Festival. November Theatre produced its final showing at the Tarragon Theatre in Toronto in the fall of 2008.

In 2006, Los Angeles' Ahmanson Theatre re-staged the production, bringing the cast together for one final time. Several members of the original cast were unavailable, most notably Marianne Faithfull, whose role was filled by Vance Avery. The cast was also joined by John Vickery.

Following the concept of the director of the independent theatre, PanoDrama, Anna Lengyel the play was staged in the Hungarian National Theater during the Budapest Spring Festival in 2009 by renowned director Tamás Ascher. In 2022, another performance was staged in Hungary at the Örkény Színház, Budapest, directed by Csaba Polgár.

In Barcelona, The Black Rider was the first musical to open at Teatre Almeria. Produced by the Companyia Gataró starting December 2009, it was performed by Oscar Martínez (Wilhelm), Ferran Frauca (Robert), Bealia Guerra (Kätchen), Jordi Vidal (Pegleg), Muntsa Rius (Anne) and Frank Capdet (Bertram), plus special guest acting by Xavier Ribera-Vall (Kuno).

The play was also staged by in Estonia by VAT Theatre in 2011. It took place in Tallinn, which was a European Capital of Culture for 2011.

In November 2012, the play was presented at the Schaubühne in Berlin.

In 2014, the play was staged by Rogaland Teater in Stavanger, Norway.

In both 2000 and 2015, the play was staged by the Betty Nansen theatre in Copenhagen, Denmark, both times with Jimmy Jørgensen as Pegleg.

The work was performed by Victorian Opera as part of the 2017 Melbourne Festival, starring Kanen Breen and Meow Meow.

In 2018, it was staged at the Theater Regensburg.

The Theater Lübeck staged the play in its 2026-27 season.
