= Francie =

Francie is a given name, often a shortened form of Francis (male) or Frances (female).

The name may refer to:

== People ==
- Francie Barrett (born 1977), Irish boxer
- Francie Bellew (born 1976), Irish Gaelic footballer
- Francie Brolly (1938–2020), Northern Ireland Sinn Féin politician
- Françoise Ducros, Canadian government official
- Francie Kraker Goodridge (born 1947), American former women's track and field athlete and coach
- Francie Grehan, Irish Gaelic footballer
- Francie Molloy (born 1950), Northern Ireland Sinn Féin politician
- Francis O'Brien (Irish politician) (born 1943), Irish former Fianna Fáil politician
- Francie Larrieu Smith (born 1952), American middle- and long-distance runner

== Other ==
- Francie (Barbie), a fashion doll produced by Mattel
- Francis "Francie" Brady, protagonist of the Irish novel The Butcher Boy
- Francie Calfo, a fictional character on the television series Alias
- Francie Nolan, heroine of the novel A Tree Grows in Brooklyn, as well as the 1945 film and 1951 Broadway musical adaptations
- Francie Stevens, in the 1955 movie To Catch a Thief and the novel on which it was based, played by Grace Kelly in the film
- half of the act Francie and Josie, Francie being played by Scottish comedian Jack Milroy
- Francie, a character created by American cartoonist Al Columbia
- Francie (restaurant), an Italian restaurant in Brooklyn, New York

== See also ==
- Frannie
