= Tipton Female Seminary =

Female seminary in Covington, Tennessee (1854–c. 1894)

Coordinates: 35.5615°N 89.6497°W

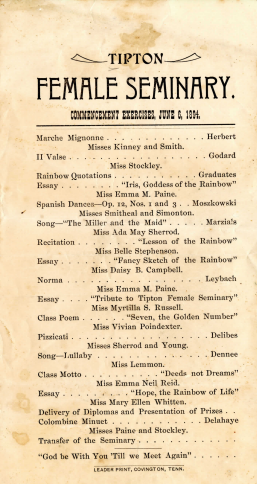
Program of the commencement exercises for Tipton Female Seminary on June 6, 1894

Tipton Female Seminary, also known as Tipton Female Academy, was a female seminary established in 1854 in Covington, Tennessee. It closed sometimes around c. 1894.

== History ==
Tipton Female Seminary was founded in 1854, and led from 1857 to 1868 by Rev. James Holmes (1801–1873). James Holmes had founded Mountain Academy in 1832 in Tipton County and led it for about 15 years. From 1849 until 1857, he served as president of West Tennessee College at Jackson. Holmes was principal of Tipton Female Academy from 1857 to 1868. On April 23, 1861, the "Southern Confederates" group met at the school, for an organizational meeting.

In 1868, James Holmes was succeeded by his son, George Duffield Holmes (1831–1894). In 1891, the school presented awards during commencement for scholarship, music, dictation, penmanship, and punctuality.

The school catalogue for 1888–1889 is held by the University of Memphis, and the June 6, 1894 school commencement program is extant.

== Alumni ==
- Frances Boyd Calhoun (1867–1909), teacher, poet, and author of Miss Minerva and William Green Hill (1909)
