= Frannie Peabody =

American HIV/Aids activist

Frances W. Peabody (April 18, 1903 – June 26, 2001), known as Frannie, was an HIV/AIDS activist.

Her work as an activist began at the age of 80 when her eldest grandchild was diagnosed with AIDS and continued for 18 years until her death in 2001. She helped establish The AIDS Project, which became Maine's largest AIDS service organization, and co-founded the Peabody House assisted living facility. In 2002, after her death, the two organizations merged, becoming the Frannie Peabody Center.

== See also ==
HIV/AIDS in the United States
