= Mabel Betsy Hill =

American writer

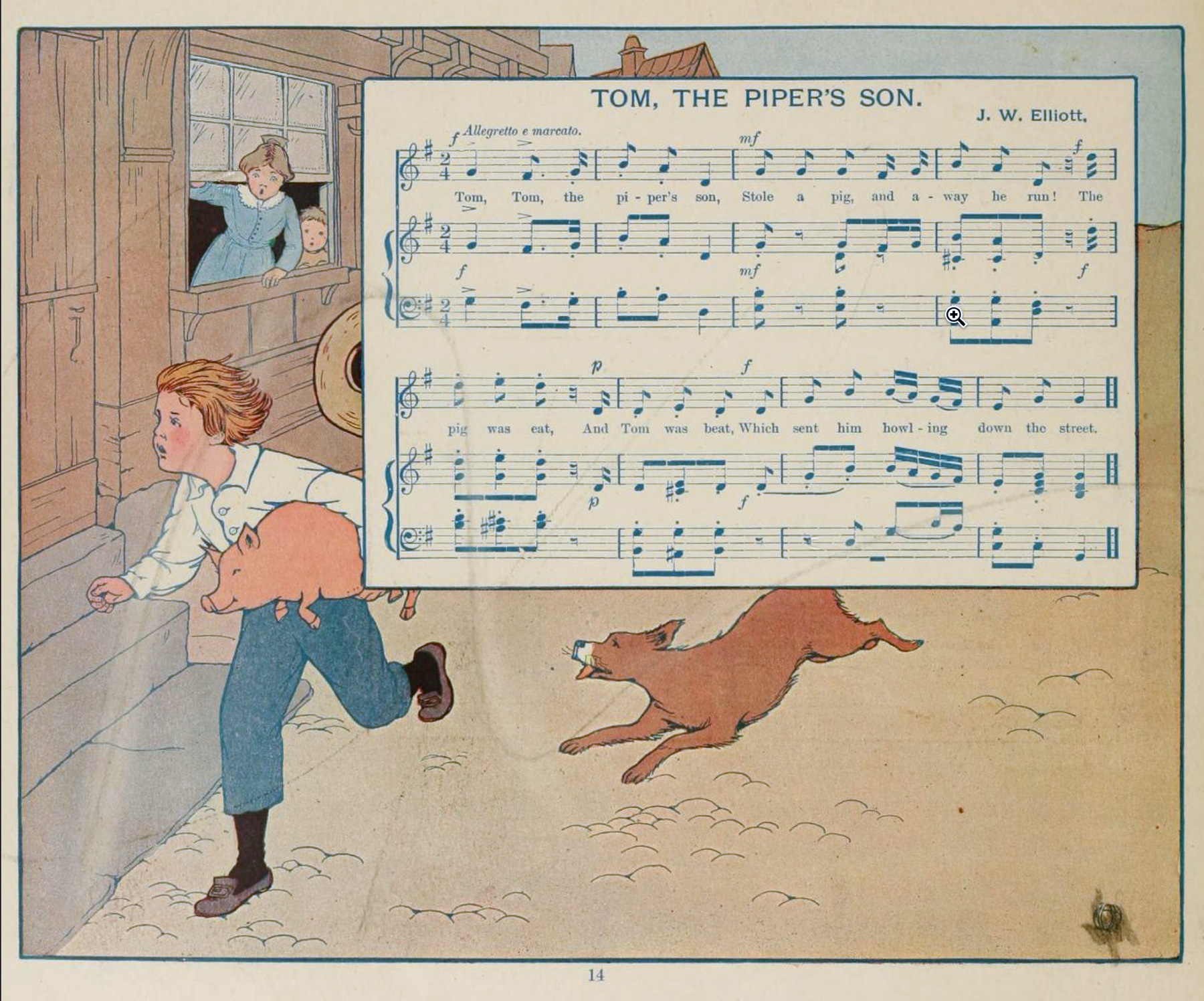
Full-page illustration by Mabel Betsy Hill for The Most Popular Mother Goose Songs (1915).

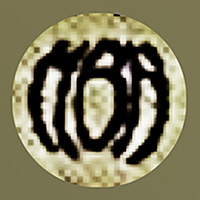
Mabel Betsy Hill's typical signature mongram.

Mabel Betsy Hill (1877 – 1971) was an American illustrator and author of children's books active in the first half of the 20th century. Her highly linear style with color fills in muted shades of orange, brown, and blue was typical of her era, akin to the work of Maginel Wright Enright and Nans van Leeuwen.

Hill wrote and illustrated her own books such as the "Judy Jo" series, which has a New England girl as the protagonist of mild adventures like helping a needy family in a blizzard. She also illustrated works by other authors, especially a series of readers by Emma Miller Bolenius. For The Most Popular Mother Goose Songs (1915), each of her full-page illustrations is designed to accommodate a block of sheet music without destroying the composition.

Hill contributed illustrations to magazines like St. Nicholas and Ladies' World. Mabel Betsy Hill died in June of 1971 in New York, United States. She was 94 years old.

== Selected books ==
=== Illustrated by Hill ===
- 101 Ways to Entertain Your Child When Recovering From an Illness or Separated from Playmates, by Jane Parker (Noble & Noble, New York, 1932)
- Animal Friends: A First Reader, by Emma Miller Bolenius (Houghton Mifflin, 1930)
- Happy Days: A Second Reader, by Emma Miller Bolenius (Houghton Mifflin, 1930)
- Door to Bookland: A Third Reader, by Emma Miller Bolenius (Houghton Mifflin, 1930)
- Fanciful Tales for Children (Longman, Green, 1927)
- Lamp-Light Tales by Pauline Carrington Bouvé (Grosset & Dunlap, 1923)
- Little Kittens: Folk Tales and Nursery Rimes (Hang Fire Books, 1928)
- Moths and Butterflies, by Lina M. Johns and May Averill (F. A. Owen Publishing Co., 1930)
- The Boys' and Girls' Readers: Fifth Reader, by Emma Miller Bolenius (Houghton Mifflin, 1919)
- The Boys' and Girls' Readers: Sixth Reader, by Emma Miller Bolenius (Houghton Mifflin, 1919)
- The Most Popular Mother Goose Songs (Hinds, Nobel & Eldridge, 1915)
- When They Were Girls, by Rebecca Deming Moore (Owen Publishing Co., 1923)

=== Written and illustrated by Hill ===
- A Day with Mopsy (Frederick A. Stokes, 1941)
- Roddy Meets the Circus (Lippincott, 1944)
- The Enchanted Playhouse (Lippincott, 1950)

==== Judy Jo series ====
- Down-Along Apple Market Street (Lippincott, 1934)
- Summer Comes to Apple Market Street (Frederick A. Stokes, 1937)
- Along Comes Judy Jo (Frederick A. Stokes, 1943)
- Jack O'Lantern for Judy Jo: An Apple Market Street Story (Frederick A. Stokes, 1940)
- Judy Jo's Magic Island (Lippincott, 1954)
- Surprise for Judy Jo: An Apple Market Street Story (Frederick A. Stokes, 1939)
- The Old House at Duck Light Cove (Lippincott, 1946)
- The Snowed-In Family: A Judy Jo Story (Lippincott, 1952)
