= Frances Charlotte Naish =

- Born: 17 January 1908
- Died: 24 March 1959 (aged 51); Newcastle, England
- Occupations: GP; Infant health researcher
- Employer: Royal Free Hospital

Frances Charlotte Naish (17 January 1908 – 24 March 1959) was a British general practitioner who pioneered aspects of infant health research.

== Biography ==
Naish was born in Sheffield. Her parents were both medics: her mother Dr. Lucy Naish was a lecturer in osteology and her father, A.E. Naish was Professor of medicine, both at the University of Sheffield. Like her parents, she was a practising Quaker her whole life.

She was educated at Sheffield High School, Girton College, Cambridge, and the Royal Free Hospital. She worked as the house-surgeon at the Royal Free Hospital, and then house-physician at the Devon and East Cornwall Hospital before returning to the Royal Free as an obstetrician. She started her own general practice in Islington in 1936. During the Second World War she worked in South Wales, Leicestershire and, eventually, York.

Her primary research interest was in infant health. Her 1947 book Breast feeding : a guide to the natural feeding of infants was awarded the Sir Charles Hastings Clinical Essay Prize for 'the promotion of systematic observation, research and record in general practice'. In 1948 she held weekly clinics at her surgery for mothers and babies only, combining the idea of preventative and curative medicine in infants – she described this clinic as her "experiment in family practice".

From 1954 to 1957, she was a member of the first council of the College of General Practitioners. While in York, she was a member of several local medical committees and acted as chairperson of the advisory panel on child health to the Leeds Regional Hospital Board.

In 1954, Naish retired from general practice and opened, with her husband, a special school for children.

== Select publications ==
- Naish, F. C. 1947. Breast feeding : a guide to the natural feeding of infants.
- Naish, F. C. 1949. "Morbidity and feeding in infancy", The Lancet 256, 146.
- Craig, W.G., Naish, F.C., Buchanan, M.F.G. 1950. "Instruction of the Medical Student in Pediatrics: An Insight Into Family Practice", Journal of the Association of American Medical Colleges 25 (2), 117–121.
- Naish, F.C. 1953. "Breast-feeding difficulties", British Medical Journal 4825, 1442–1444.
- Naish, F.C. and Weston Edwards, P. 1952. "Initial Weight-Loss: A Preliminary Enquiry", Archives of Diseases in Childhood 27, 445–448.
- Naish, F.C. 1954. "An experiment in family practice within the National Health Service", The Lancet 266, 1342–1343.
