= Frances Trego Montgomery =

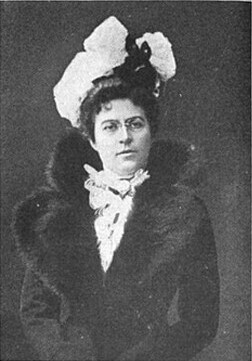
- Born: July 18, 1858; Philadelphia
- Died: April 5, 1925 (aged 66)
- Occupation: Writer

Frances Trego Montgomery (July 18, 1858 – April 5, 1925) was an American children's book writer best known for her series of books about the goat Billy Whiskers.

Frances Trego Montgomery was born on July 18, 1858 in Philadelphia.

Starting in 1902, Montgomery published a series of children's books starring the goat Billy Whiskers, who had mischievous adventures all over the world. The immense popularity of the books took Saalfield Publishing from a small Akron, Ohio publishing company to one of the world's largest publishers. The many fans of the series included a young John F. Kennedy. The books also contain rather coarse descriptions of ethnicities.

She wrote a pair of books about the "Electric Elephant", a mechanical hollow elephant the protagonist uses to tour the Solar System and galaxy. She also created the board game Lottery of Marriage.

Frances Trego Montgomery died on 5 April 1925 onboard the SS Franconia as it was sailing between Hong Kong and Shanghai.

== Personal life ==
She married wealthy Chicago broker Hugh M. S. Montgomery and they had two daughters. They divorced in 1909. She married George Porteous in 1910 and that marriage was annulled in 1913.

== Bibliography ==
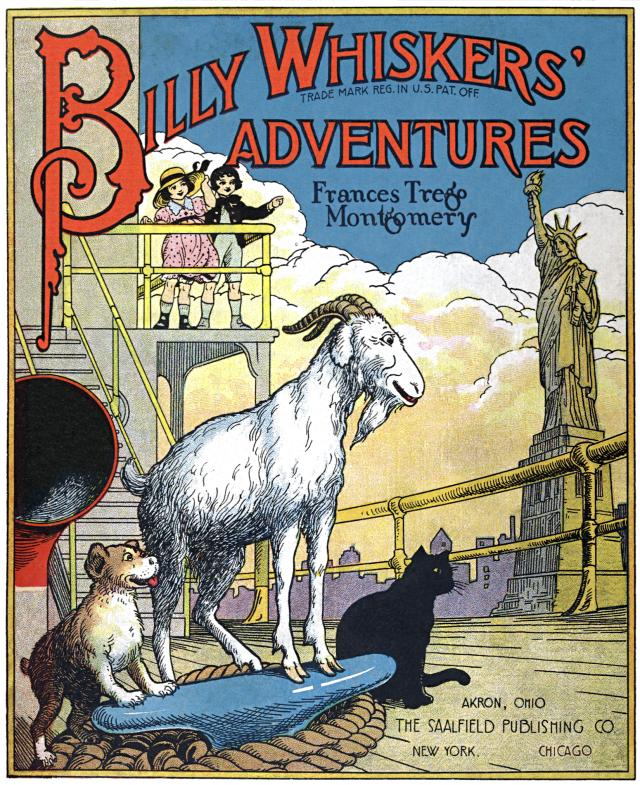
Billy Whiskers' Adventures (1920)

=== Billy Whiskers ===
- 1. Billy Whiskers; the Autobiography of a Goat (1902)
- 2. Billy Whiskers' Kids; or, Day and Night; A Sequel to Billy Whiskers (1903)
- 3. Billy Whiskers, Jr. (1904)
- 4. Billy Whiskers' Friends (1906)
- 5. Billy Whiskers' Travels (1907)
- 6. Billy Whiskers, Jr. and His Chums (1907)
- 7. Billy Whiskers at the Circus (1908)
- 8. Billy Whiskers' Vacation (1908)
- 9. Billy Whiskers at the Fair (1909)
- 10. Billy Whiskers' Grandchildren (1909)
- 11. Billy Whiskers Kidnaped (1910)
- 12. Billy Whiskers Twins (1911)
- 13. Billy Whiskers in an Aeroplane (1912)
- 14. Billy Whiskers in Town (1913)
- 15. Billy Whiskers in Panama (1914)
- 16. Billy Whiskers on the Mississippi (1915)
- 17. Billy Whiskers at the Exposition (1915)
- 18. Billy Whiskers Out West (1916)
- 19. Billy Whiskers in the South (1917)
- 20. Billy Whiskers in Camp (1918)
- 21. Billy Whiskers' Adventures (1920)
- 22. Billy Whiskers in the Movies (1921)
- 23. Billy Whiskers Out for Fun (1922)
- 24. Billy Whiskers' Frolics (1923)
- 25. Billy Whiskers at Home (1924)
- 26. Billy Whiskers' Pranks (1925)
- 27. Billy Whiskers in Mischief; Continuing the Famous Billy Whiskers Series (1926)
- 28. Billy Whiskers and the Radio; Continuing the Famous Billy Whiskers Series (1927)
- 29. Billy Whiskers' Treasure Hunt; Continuing the Famous Billy Whiskers Series (1928)
- 30. Billy Whiskers Tourist; Continuing the Famous Billy Whiskers Series (1929)
- 31. Billy Whiskers Stowaway; Continuing the Famous Billy Whiskers Series (1930)

=== Other works ===
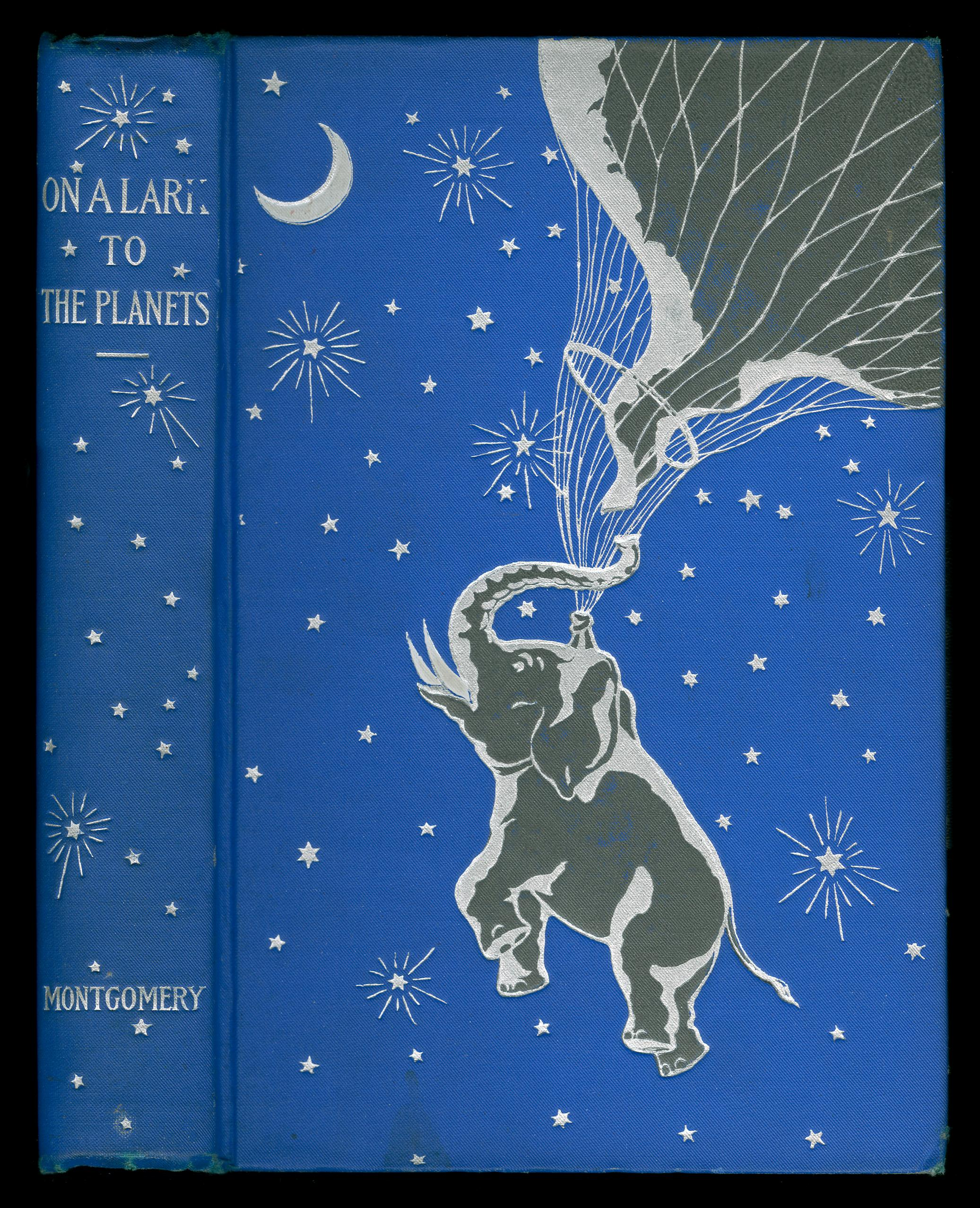
On a Lark to the Planets: A Sequel to the "Wonderful Electric Elephant" (1904)

- Cats and Kitts. Von Hasten. Hugo, illus.- N.D Bane & Hopkins
- Chickens and Chicks. Von Hofsten. Hugo. illus. - N.D. Barre & Hopkins
- Christmas with Santa Claus. Hallock, Ruth Mary (1876-) (Illus./ 24cm 154p. c.1905. The Saalfield Pub
- Dogs and Puppies. Von Hofsten. Hugo, illus. (Illus.). ND. Barsc & Hopkins.
- Frances and the Irrepressibles at Buena Vista Farm. c 1905. The Saalfield Pub. Co.
- On a Lark to the Planets: A Sequel to the "Wonderful Electric Elephant" (Akron, Ohio: The Saalfield Publishing Co, 1904), illustrator Winifred E. Elrod
- Pigs and Piggies. Von Hofsten, Hugo, illus. N.D. Banc & Hopkins.
- Santa Claus' Twin Brother. Hofsten, Hugo Von. Illus. 1907 Brewer, Banc & Co
- The Wonderful Electric Elephant (Akron, Ohio: The Saalfield Publishing Co, 1903), illustrator C M Coolidge]
- Zip: The Adventures of a Frisky Fox Terrier. Higgins. Violet Moore. illus, c 1917. The Saalfield Publishing Company.
