= November Theatre =

Theatre company in Vancouver, Canada (formerly in Edmonton)

November Theatre is a Canadian theatre company that started in Edmonton, Alberta but is now based in Vancouver, British Columbia. The company's Artistic Producer is Michael Scholar, Jr.

== History ==
The company was founded in 1998 by Corinne Kessel of the band Los Furios and Michael Scholar Jr. Their first production was world English premiere of the expressionist operetta The Black Rider at the Edmonton International Fringe Festival. The Black Rider was created through the collaboration of singer-songwriter Tom Waits, William S. Burroughs, and avant-garde stage director Robert Wilson. In 1999, they were invited to bring The Black Rider to the New York Fringe Fringe Festival where it won the festival award for “Best Direction”.

In 2010, November Theatre went on to produce the stage adaptation of Hard Core Logo, the Bruce McDonald film and Michael Turner book. Joe "Shithead" Keithley of D.O.A. composed new music for the show called "Hard Core Logo: Live". The script was written by Founding Artistic Producer Michael Scholar, Jr. The production premiered at Theatre Network in Edmonton in 2010 before touring to the PuSh Festival in Vancouver in 2011.

== Touring history ==
November Theatre's production went on to tour Canada in 2004–2005. The production went on to win 6 Elizabeth Sterling Haynes Awards in Edmonton and 6 Betty Mitchell Awards in Calgary including "Best Production" and "Best Direction" in both major centres. In 2006, the production was presented at the Magnetic North Theatre Festival in St. John's Newfoundland. The production was remounted in Vancouver, January/February 2008 for the Arts Club Theatre Company and the PuSh Festival and then in 2009 for the Tarragon Theatre in Toronto.
