= Frances Ekstam =

American professor

- Born: Frances Clark; January 6, 1914; Des Moines, Iowa
- Died: January 18, 2005 (aged 91); Greenwood, Indiana
- Burial place: Park Hill Cemetery and Mausoleum
- Education: Chicago Normal School; Illinois State Normal University; Indiana University
- Occupation: Professor
- Spouse: Harold C. Ekstam

Frances Ekstam (January 6, 1914 – January 18, 2005), a native of Des Moines, Iowa, was founder of the physical therapy program at Indiana University School of Medicine.

== Early life ==
Frances Clark was born to Charles A. and Edith (Sims) Clark on January 6, 1914, in Des Moines, Iowa. She married Harold C. Ekstam on June 13, 1942. A Methodist, and member of the Woman's Rotary in Indianapolis, she lived most of her professional life in Indiana.

== Education ==
Ekstam earned a Bachelor of Physical Education in 1933 from Chicago Normal School. She earned a Bachelor of Education in 1935 from Illinois State Normal University. She earned a certificate in physical therapy from Harvard Medical School in 1944 in part thanks to a scholarship from the United States Department of Public Welfare. She earned a Master of Science in 1960 from Indiana University (IU).

== Career ==
From 1936–1942, Ekstam was a teacher in Dowagiac Public Schools in Michigan. From 1945–1946, she was a staff physical therapist in the Cerebral Palsy Clinic at the Indiana University Medical Center in Indianapolis. She served as supervisor of physical therapy at James Whitcomb Riley Hospital at the Indiana University Medical Center. She joined the faculty at the Indiana University School of Medicine in 1946 and worked there for 34 years as a professor and founder of the physical therapy program. Her research focused on pioneering treatments for patients with polio, ambulation, and the development of an applied physical therapy treatment manual. She was instrumental in creating legislation to license physical therapists in Indiana.

She served on the Vocational Rehabilitation Administration in Washington, D.C. starting in 1963, the Indiana Board of Medical Registration starting in 1957, as Vice President Speedway Medical Arts, Inc from 1962; a member of the American Physical Therapy Association where she served as a member of the Board of Directors, and the Council of Physical Therapy School Directors.

In October 1958, she was appointed to direct the physical therapy program at IU; her responsibilities included counseling students and supervising clinical study. Ekstam also served as an accreditation surveyor for the American Physical Therapy Association. She also lectured on polio patients and participated in fundraising events for March of Dimes. During the polio epidemics of 1946, 1949, and 1951, Ekstam personally treated more than 2,000 patients and oversaw the care of thousands more.

== Death and legacy ==
Ekstam died in Greenwood, Indiana, on January 18, 2005. Her husband had previously died on August 20, 1986. Ekstam and her husband are both buried in Park Hill Cemetery and Mausoleum in Bloomington, Illinois.

Ekstam is credited with creating the bachelor's and master's degree programs in physical therapy at the IU School of Medicine, the first such degrees in Indiana.

== Honors and awards ==
In 2000, Ekstam received the Sagamore of the Wabash from Indiana Governor Frank O'Bannon. The American Physical Therapy Association awarded her the Lucy Blair Award in 1974, which honors physical therapists of exceptional qualities is one of the highest awards the Association bestows for outstanding service to physical therapy. The IU School of Medicine is located on the Indiana University Purdue University Indianapolis campus; IUPUI awarded Ekstam its Spirit of Philanthropy Award in 2004. The IU School of Medicine also has an Endowed Professorship in her name and a classroom and clinical laboratory are named in her honor on campus and there is a bronze bust in the hallway on the floor named for her; the Indiana State chapter of the American Physical Therapy Association has named their outstanding contributions award for Frances Ekstam.
