= Marie Goodman Hunter =

American actress and singer (1929–2024)

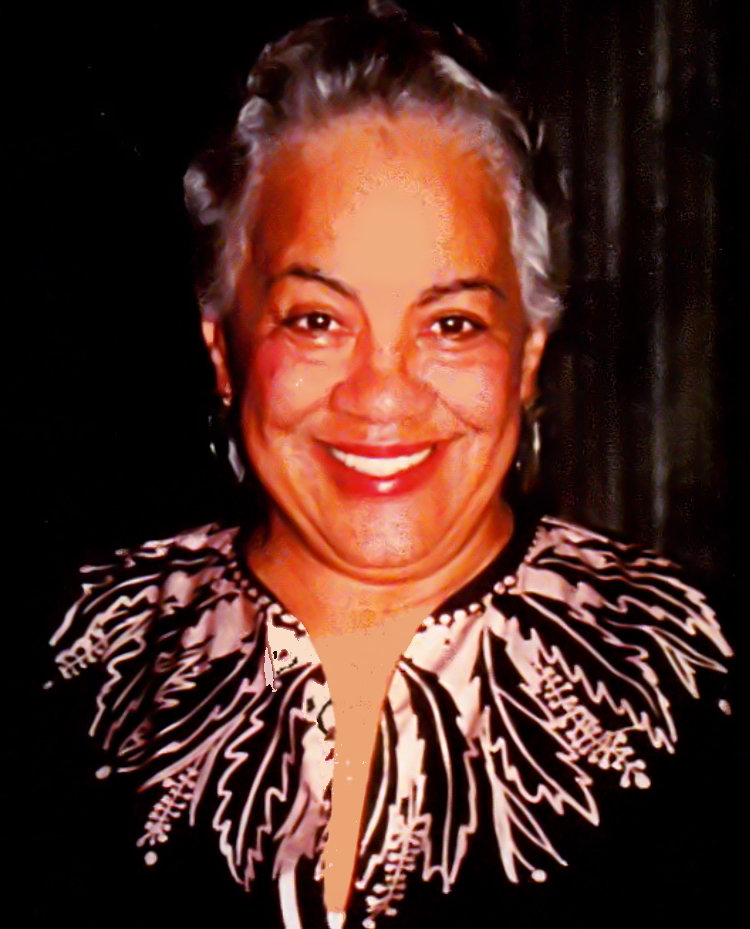
Goodman Hunter in 2013

Florence Marie Goodman Hunter (October 16, 1929 – October 21, 2024) was an American actress, singer, and educator. She was adopted when young and grew up in Petersburg and Richmond, Virginia. She taught Music and Speech for 30 years at John Marshall High School. A mezzo soprano, she also performed as a soloist in Richmond churches.

Beginning in the late 1950s, she began to act in the Virginia Museum Theater, a community theater. When it became an Equity/LORT in 1969, she was among those invited to join as an Equity actor and become a professional in the company. From 1976 to 2001 she won six Phoebe awards from Richmond newspapers for her acting, a record in the city. She also had the opportunity to act with other companies, including at the McCarter Theatre in Princeton, New Jersey; the Alabama Shakespeare Festival; and in Caux, Switzerland. While retired from full seasons, Goodman Hunter continued to perform in special concerts or events.

== Early life ==
Adopted when young by Fred and Florence Goodman, she was named Florence Marie Goodman and known as Marie. She attended public schools in Petersburg and Richmond, Virginia, where her family lived as she was growing up. She discovered her innate musical ability when her parents took her as a child of six to a Palm Sunday service at a family member's school. The festivities were to include a vocal recital, but the singer did not show up. Young Marie, thinking that singing was everyone's natural gift, volunteered to entertain. With no prior lessons, she sang the familiar hymn, "I Come to the Garden Alone", to great acclaim.

== Singing and acting ==
Goodman Hunter was a mezzo-soprano and she performed as a soloist at numerous Richmond churches, including First Baptist Church of South Richmond and Garland Avenue Baptist. As she performed more, she also discovered a talent and desire for acting.

An Actress Who Happens to be Black

With combined singing and acting talents, Goodman Hunter was hired as the first African American in the cast of Paul Green's The Common Glory, the annual patriotic pageant in Williamsburg, Virginia. She also acted at the Barter Theater in Abingdon and Swift Creek Mill Theater in Colonial Heights.

Asked about the casting odds she faced, Goodman Hunter said, "I appreciate directors who hire you as an actress who happens to be black and not as a black actress."

When VMT attained full professional repertory status, Goodman Hunter was one of the local actors who received an Equity contract. She gained professional rank in the VMT Rep company, produced under the artistic direction of Keith Fowler, which included Ken Letner, E.G. Marshall, Alfred Drake, Janet Bell, Lynda Myles, and dramaturg M. Elizabeth Osborn. Fowler produced both new American plays and world premieres of works by European playwrights, in addition to some American classics. In 1974 Goodman Hunter got to use all her performance skills as the Innkeeper's Wife in Man With a Load of Mischief. Among major roles she played at VMT were Berenice in The Member of the Wedding, Missy in Purlie, Ginny Jenny in The Threepenny Opera, and Adelaide in Guys and Dolls.

Goodman Hunter received particular acclaim for her work as Adelaide. Although the role had been traditionally played by white performers, reviewers saw Goodman Hunter as the standout of the production, stating “Miss Adelaide may be her finest hour.”

Goodman Hunter died on October 21, 2024, at the age of 95.

== Legacy and honors ==
In 1982, Goodman Hunter received the Mayor's Award for “Most Outstanding Contribution to the Arts.”

She won a record total of six Phoebe awards as “Best Actress” from Richmond newspapers. These were for the following performances:

- The Member of the Wedding, 1976
- Purlie, 1978
- A Raisin in the Sun, 1985
- The Amen Corner, 1987
- ’Night, Mother, 1988
- Having Our Say--The Delaney Sisters, 2001
