= Frances Elizabeth Herring =

Frances Herring
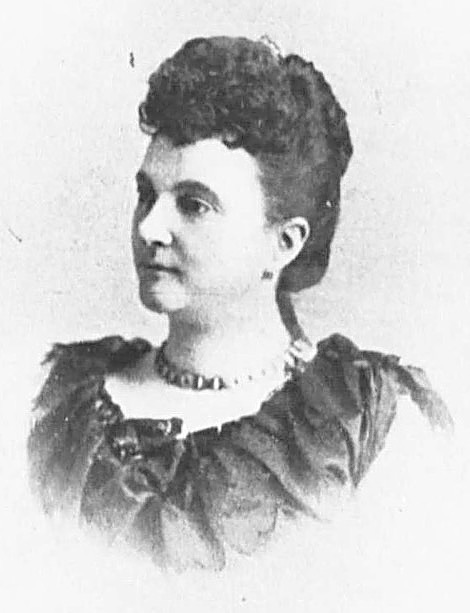
- Herring, c. 1913
- Born: December 23, 1851; King's Lynn, Norfolk, England
- Died: November 17, 1916 (aged 64); New Westminster, British Columbia
- Occupation: Writer
- Writing career
- Period: 20th century

Frances Elizabeth Herring, (Note: Herring is sometimes incorrectly referred to as Frances Clarke which was her mother's maiden name. Herring's surname is the same as her maiden name as she married Arthur Herring, a cousin.) (December 23, 1851 - November 16, 1916) was a Canadian journalist and novelist. In addition to her fiction, she wrote history books on British Columbia.

== Biography ==
Herring was born in King's Lynn, Norfolk in southern England. Her parents were John Jonathan Herring and Harriet Clarke. She taught briefly in Reading before emigrating to British Columbia in 1871. In 1874 she married her cousin, Arthur Herring. They settled in Langley, B.C. where she worked as a teacher. Langley at the time was a former fur trading post and many of her students were from First Nations (Perry, 162). According to an 1877 report by the provincial superintendent of education, she was one of the best teachers. In 1878 Herring and her husband moved to New Westminster where he started a wholesale and retail drug business. Frances spent her time in raising her family which eventually numbered to eight children.

Herring lived in a relatively well off middle class family and spent some of her free time becoming involved in the women's movement. She became president of the Royal Columbian Hospital Women's Auxiliary. During her time there she incorporated the organization in the National Council of Women of Canada which mirrored her interest in women's suffrage. In 1909 she was the secretary-treasurer for the Literature Committee of the local branch of the Women's Auxiliary to the Missionary Society of the Church of England in Canada.

In 1890 she began to write as a columnist for the British Columbia Commonwealth. She also did work for the Toronto Globe. After 1900, she focused her writing on novels and published six books. Five of these books were romances set in B.C. in the late nineteenth century. Adele Perry describes them as a curious combination of melodrama and travel literature.

Herring continued to write up until her death in 1916 due to diabetes.

== Works ==
=== Non-fiction ===
- Canadian Camp Life, (1900)
- Among The People Of British Columbia (1903)
- In The Pathless West With Soldiers, Pioneers, Miners...(1904)

=== Fiction ===
- On The Pathless West (1904)
- Nan And Other Pioneer Women Of The West (1913)
- Ena (1913)
- The Gold Miners (1914), A Sequel To On The Pathless West
