= Frances Elizabeth Fryatt =

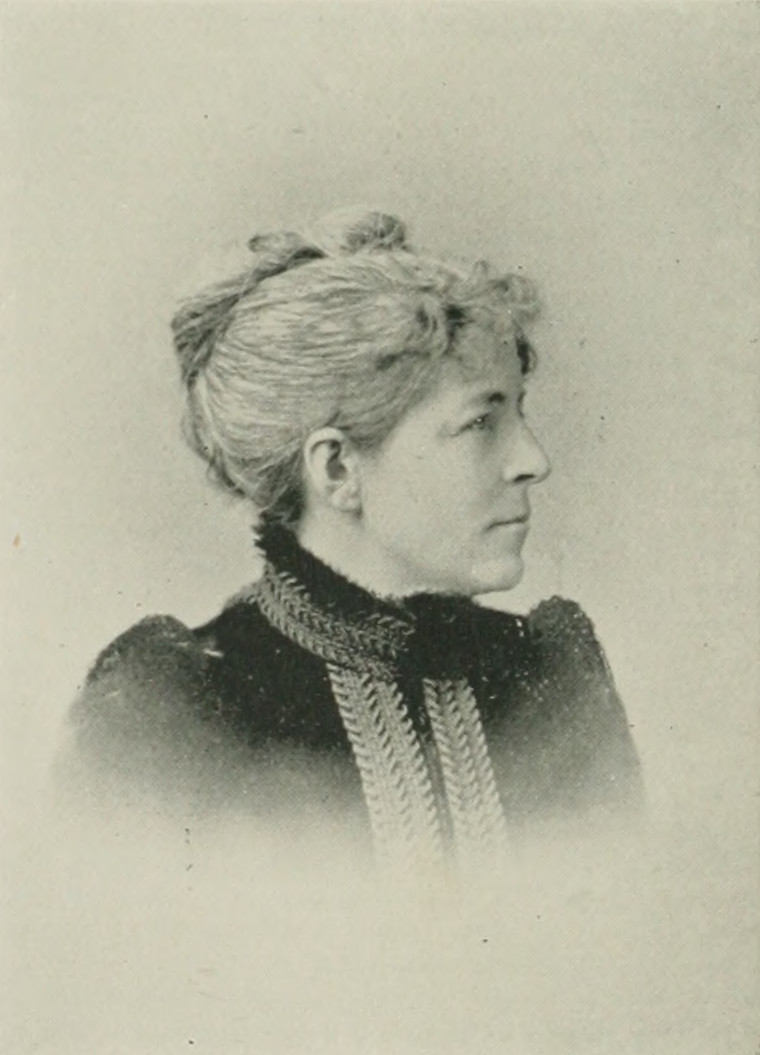
- Photo in A Woman of the Century
- Occupations: author; editor
- Writing career
- Pen name: F. E. Fryatt
- Language: English
- Subject: applied arts

Frances Elizabeth Fryatt (pen name, F. E. Fryatt) was an American author and specialist in household applied arts. She served as editor-in-chief of The Lady's World after its establishment in 1886. She was twice elected president of the Ladies' Art Association of New York.

== Early life ==
Frances Elizabeth Fryatt was born in New York City, but spent her girlhood in the countryside. In her childhood, she wrote for pleasure and chiefly in verse, taking up literature as a life-work on the death of her father, Horatio N. Fryatt, who had written articles on science, law and finance during the intervals of his busy life as a New York merchant. After the death of her father, the family moved to the city.

== Career ==
Fryatt commenced to write for New York newspapers, the New-York Evening Post, the Commercial Advertiser, the Tribune and the Daily Graphic, a line of work soon relinquished for the more congenial field of magazine literature. An article entitled "Lunar Lore and Portraiture", written for the Popular Science Monthly and published in August, 1881, involved extended reading and research. In 1879, she became a contributor to Harper's Magazine, The Independent, The Churchman, the Illustrated Christian Weekly, the Art Age, and later to Harper's Young People and Wide Awake.

In 1881, she began writing articles for The Art Interchange on art applied to the house, including monographs on embroidery, glass painting, and staining, wood-carving, painting on china, designing for carpets and wallpaper, schemes of exterior and interior coloring, and decoration from architects' plans and sketches. She wrote all the answers to queries on house-furnishing and decoration published by The Art Interchange during the period of 1883–93, as well as the answers to numberless queries on a great variety of subjects. From 1886, Fryatt served as editor-in-chief of The Lady's World, a monthly devoted to the home, conducting eight of its departments, and writing all the editorials and most of the technical articles. Fryatt had previously occupied the positions of assistant editor and art-editor of the Manhattan Magazine of New York. Among other works not mentioned may be included Fryatt's articles on the art-industry and notes on the fine arts.

After retiring to a suburb of Brooklyn, on account of failing health, she built the cottage, "Fairhope". There, she had her private editorial office and library, and she kept up her interest in various humanitarian movements. In 1891, Fryatt was elected president of the Ladies' Art Association of New York, and she was re-elected in May, 1892.

== Selected works ==
- "The Children's Hour : A Novel Art-School", in Some Curious Schools
