= Emma Miller Bolenius =

American educator

- Born: May 3, 1876; Lancaster, Pennsylvania
- Died: July 25, 1968 (aged 92); Lancaster, Pennsylvania
- Other names: Emma Miller Whitney
- Occupation(s): Educator, magazine writer, textbook author

Emma Miller Bolenius (May 3, 1876 – July 25, 1968) was an American educator and textbook writer.

== Early life and education ==
Bolenius was born in Lancaster, Pennsylvania, the daughter of Robert Miller Bolenius and Catherine Mathiot Carpenter Bolenius. Her father wrote Germans in Pennsylvania (1906). She graduated from Maryland College for Women in Lutherville in 1896, earned a bachelor's degree at Bucknell University, and a master's degree at Columbia University.

== Career ==
Bolenius taught at Maryland College, and at schools in Ohio and New Jersey, and was a professor of English and History at Roanoke Women's College. She was known for promoting the "project method" of teaching spoken English: assigning students a real-life situation of "socialized recitation", for example, presenting an award or campaigning for office, to focus and motivate their composition and speech. Her pedagogy blended language instruction with "wholesome moral lessons" and the Americanization goals common in public education at the time.

== Publications ==
Bolenius was best known as a textbook author. One journal reviewed her first book, The Teaching of Oral English (1914) as "a delightfully unique textbook that reads like a novel". Bolenius wrote a monthly column on language for McCall's Magazine; she also wrote a monthly column titled "Where Girls May Meet" for the journal American Motherhood, responding to the letters she received from girls. Her publications included the following titles:

- "The Dear Friend from France" (1909, short story)
- The Teaching of Oral English (1914)
- Teaching Literature in the Grammar Grades and High School (1915)
- "The ph Group of Words: How to Enliven Your Work in Language" (1916)
- "Ingenious Devices Contrived by the Bride and the Handyman" (1916)
- "Words and How to Use Them" (1916)
- Everyday English composition (1917)
- Advanced Lessons in Everyday English (1921)
- First Grade Manual: A Help-Book for Teachers (1923)
- Second and Third Grade Manual: A Help-Book for Teachers (1923)
- Literature in the Junior High School (1926)
- Mother Goose Book: A Work and Play Book for Silent Reading (1928, with Marion George Kellogg and Gustaf Tenggren)
- American Literature (1933, co-edited with Thomas H. Briggs and Max J. Herzberg)
- New Frontiers (1940, co-edited with Thomas H. Briggs, Max J. Herzberg, and Lucile Prim Jackson)
- Romance (1941, co-edited with Thomas H. Briggs, Max J. Herzberg, and Lucile Prim Jackson)
- The boys' and girls' readers (a series, multiple dates, also known as The Bolenius Readers; illustrated by Mabel Betsy Hill and others)

== Personal life ==
Emma Bolenius married radio producer Edwin Morse Whitney in 1933. She lived in Pawling, New York, from 1945 to 1968, and died in 1968, aged 92 years, in Lancaster, Pennsylvania.
