= Rie Cramer =

Dutch writer and illustrator (1887–1977)

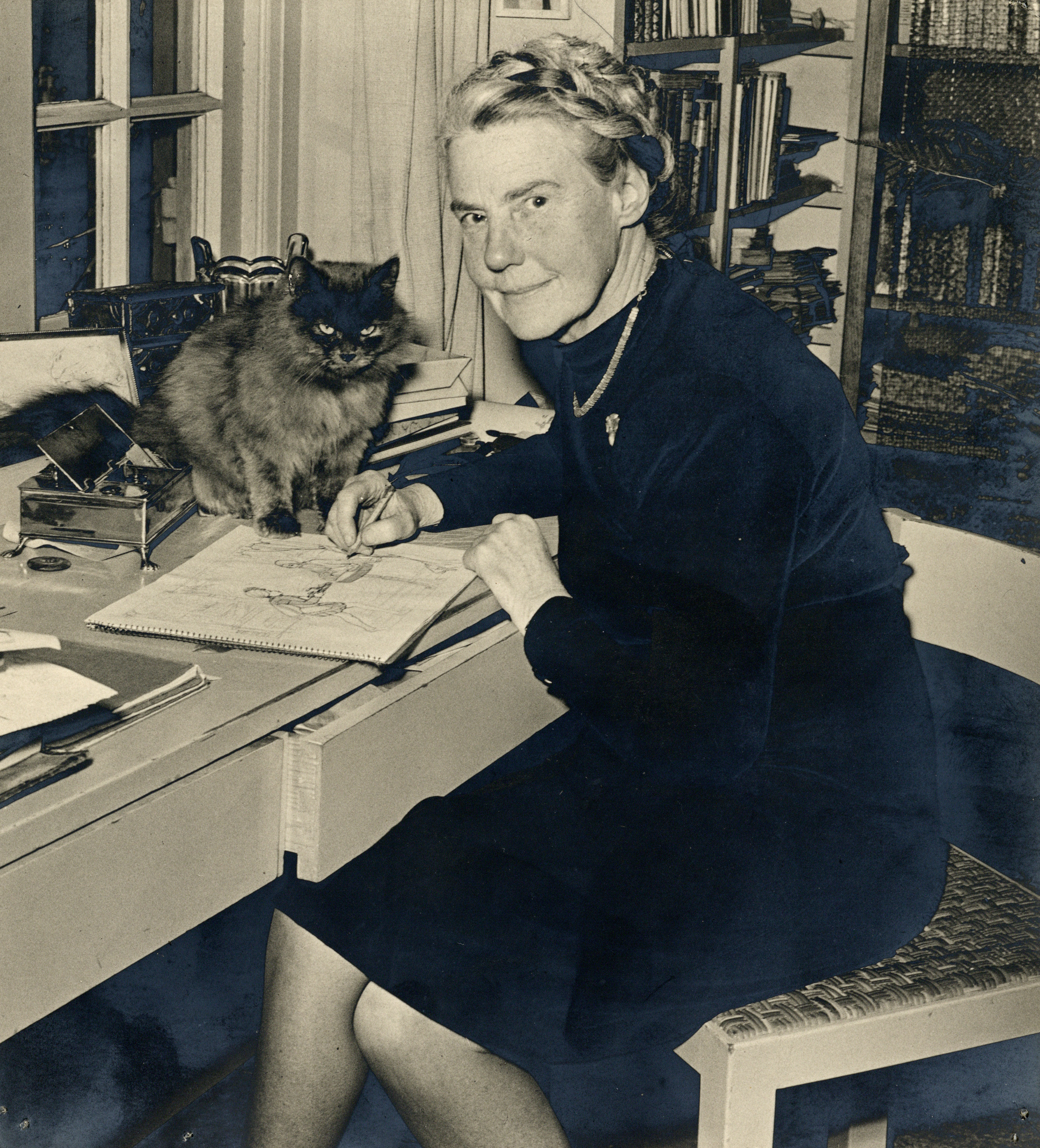
- Rie Cramer in 1947
- Born: Marie Cramer; 10 October 1887; Sukabumi, Dutch East Indies
- Died: 16 July 1977 (aged 89); Laren, Netherlands
- Education: Royal Academy of Art, The Hague
- Occupations: Illustrator, writer
- Writing career
- Pen name: Rie Cramerová, Marc Holman, Rie Verkade-Cramer, Annie Smit
- Period: 1906–1977
- Genre: Children's literature

Marie "Rie" Cramer (10 October 1887 – 16 July 1977) was a Dutch writer and prolific illustrator of children's literature whose style is considered iconic for the interwar period. For many years, she was one of the two main illustrators for a leading Dutch youth magazine, Zonneschijn (Sunshine). She also wrote plays under the pseudonym Marc Holman. Some of her work was banned during World War II because it attacked Nazism. She wrote for a leading underground newspaper during the war.

== Family and education ==
Born in Sukabumi in what was then the Dutch East Indies as the daughter of Hendrik Cramer, a ship’s captain, and Elisabeth Frederica Schenk, she moved to the Netherlands with her mother and her younger sister in 1896, where they settled in Arnhem. Encouraged by her aunt Gesine, an artist, she studied drawing in Arnhem.

In 1904, her father rejoined the family in the Netherlands, and they moved to The Hague, where Rie studied at the Royal Academy of Art from 1905 until 1907.

In 1913, she married Peter Otten, a lawyer; they divorced in 1914. In 1922 she married the actor Eduard Rutger Verkade; they divorced in 1933.

== Art career ==
Cramer is best known for her numerous illustrations for children's books, some of which she wrote, but she also illustrated adult literature including works by Shakespeare. For many years, she and Anton Pieck were the two main illustrators for Zonneschijn, a magazine that first appeared in 1924 and became the most important non-religious youth magazine of the Netherlands until it folded in 1943. She also created set designs and costumes for the theater and for the Dutch pavilion at the 1939 New York World's Fair.

She began her career as an illustrator while still a student. Her early work was influenced by illustrators like Edmund Dulac, Aubrey Beardsley, and Arthur Rackham and had a distinct Art Nouveau style. From the 1920s on, her illustrations became more simplified and less lyrical. The colours as well became less nuanced and brighter under the influence of her work on stage costumes and sets. From the 1930s on, she worked less on children's books and started writing books for young adults. She also created art pottery together with her friend Fransje Carbasius, whom she had met at the academy in The Hague.

During World War II, she continued working as an illustrator and theatrical designer, and she also wrote two plays using the pseudonym Marc Holman. Two of her earlier adult works were banned by the Germans because she had attacked National Socialism in them. She joined the resistance, helping fugitives, and she anonymously published anti-German verses in Het Parool, the largest underground resistance newspaper in the Netherlands. These verses were collected and published in 1945 as Verzen van verzet (Poems of Resistance).

After the war, her work was extensively translated into other languages, including English, German, French, and Danish. She wrote a radio play in 42 episodes in 1954, the year she left the Netherlands and settled on the Spanish island Mallorca with a few women friends. She continued producing pottery and tiles, and she wrote three books about the island. In 1971, due to failing health, she had to return to the Netherlands, where she died in 1977. Her work is still being reprinted.

Together with Henriette Willebeek le Mair and Nelly Bodenheim, Cramer is considered the most important of the Dutch women illustrators of children's books between the two world wars. Despite her success, she was the least favored by the critics because her style was rather static and sweet. When Dutch writer Annie M. G. Schmidt recalled the books of her youth, she wrote: "The illustrators of my youth were Rie Cramer and Daan Hoeksema. They poisoned fairy tales, youth corners and children's magazines.... They gave no air, neither smelled nor scented, and they left open no doors, simply shut off every way out." Whether they care for her work or not, most critics agree that her illustrations are among the most iconic and defining ones for the era.

== Partial bibliography ==
=== Written and illustrated by Rie Cramer ===
- Van meisjes en jongetjes (1906)
- Van jongetjes en meisjes (1907)
- Kindjes boek (1909)
- Het diamanten-prinsesje (1910)
- Lente (1910)
- Zomer (1910)
- Herfst (1910 of 1911)
- Winter (1911)
- Prentjes bij versjes (1913)
- Lentebloemen (1914)
- Lenteliedjes (1914)
- Van ditjes en datjes (1915)
- Het bloemenhuis (1916)
- Het poppen A.B.C. (1921)
- The little Dutch girl (ca. 1924)
- Sneeuwwitje (1925)
- Elfjesland (1926)
- Als 't haantje kraait (1927)
- Liedjes van den Mei (1927)
- Liedjes van vroeger (1928)
- Versjes van vroeger (1928)
- Tien kleine negertjes (1929)
- Babette Josselin, genaamd Babs (1931)
- Het hazekind (1931)
- De reizen van Olle Patolle (1932)
- Mijn liefste versjes (1932)
- Drie meisjes op een flat (1933)
- Dokter Levertraan (1934)
- Dommie-Dik (1934)
- Luilekkerland (1934)
- Pommie (1934)
- Mariolijne. Versjes voor kinderen (ca. 1935)
- A is een aapje (1936)
- Hans wou niet naar school toe gaan (1937)
- Het huis van Adriaan (1937)
- Vrouw Hubbard en haar hondje (1937)
- Augustus, oogstmaand (1938)
- December, wintermaand (1938)
- Januari, louwmaand (1938)
- Juli, hooimaand (1938)
- Juni, zomermaand (1938)
- Mei, bloeimaand (1938)
- November, slachtmaand (1938)
- October, slachtmaand (1938)
- September, herfstmaand (1938)
- April, grasmaand (1939)
- Februari, sprokkelmaand (1939)
- Maart, lentemaand (1939)
- Katrientje (1940)
- Rut Wijgant (1947)
- An en Jan. Leesboekjes voor het eerste leerjaar (1949)
- Zus en ik (ca. 1950)
- Gullivers reizen (1953)
- Rie Cramer (1973)
- Kindjes boek (1987)

=== Illustrated by Rie Cramer ===
- Kinderwereld (1907)
- De baronieclub (1910)
- Beatrijs (1911)
- De Canneheuveltjes in Indië (1912)
- De bruiloft van Rozemarijntje. Verhalen voor kinderen van 6-10 jaar (1914)
- Blijde mei (1915)
- Sprookjes van Hans Andersen. Deel 1 (1915)
- Sprookjes van Hans Andersen. Deel 2 (1915)
- Sprookjes van Hans Andersen. Deel 3 (1915)
- O, wat een pret! Vertellingen voor jongens en meisjes (1916)
- Sprookjes van Moeder de Gans (1916)
- Als de rozen bloeien. Vertellingen voor jongens en meisjes (1917)
- Vriendinnen (1917)
- De wilgen (1918)
- De Canneheuveltjes in Holland (1919)
- Één, ik onthou er één! (1919)
- Hamlet (ca. 1920)
- Tristan en Isolde (1920)
- Een gezellige droom! Vertellingen voor jongens en meisjes (1921)
- Een dronk uit het Hemelsche Blauw (1922)
- Jan-Jop (1922)
- Kinderen uit m'n klas (1922)
- 't Vacantie vriendinnetje (1923)
- Hoe 't zonnetje haar dag besteedde (1923)
- Uit de school geklapt (1923)
- De Westerveldjes (1924)
- Edie, de droomster (1925)
- Vroolijke wijsjes (1925)
- Zomerland (ca. 1926)
- Fred in 't ooievaarsnest (1926)
- De poppendokter en andere verhalen (1927)
- Liedjes van den Mei (1927)
- Dappere Koen (1928)
- De vriendjes (ca. 1930-1940)
- De avonturen van Pinokkio (1930)
- De kleine kolonie (1930)
- De herberg in het Spessartwoud (1931)
- De wonderbare geschiedenis van Dwerg Neus (1931)
- Arie wil schommelen (1932)
- Pinokkio's geheim (1932)
- De booze wind (1933)
- De verjaardag van pias (1933)
- De wonderlijke vangst (1933)
- Pinokkio in Afrika (1933)
- Zoo komen snoepers te pas (1933)
- De herder met de sterrenoogen (1934)
- Dokter Levertraan (1934)
- Ellie (1934)
- En nu? ... (1934)
- Pikkie Duimelot bij Oom Langejaap. Een groot verhaal voor kleine kleuters (1934)
- Allermerkwaardigste avonturen van de aardige aapjes van admiraal Adrianus Apekolio. Alfabet voor allen (1935)
- Het jaar van Juup en Toby (1935)
- Assepoester (1937)
- De gouden gans (1937)
- De schone slaapster in het bos (1937)
- Koko Duimelot bij oom Korteknaap. Een groot verhaal voor kleine kleuters (1937)
- Roodkapje (1937)
- Sneeuwwitje (1937)
- Speelmakkers. Verhaaltjes en versjes voor de kleintjes (1937)
- De gelaarsde kat (1938)
- Hans Andersen's fairy tales (1944)
- Sprookjes en vertellingen (1949). Translated in German as "Grossmütterchen erzählt", Baden, Favorit, 1965
- In de groei (1970)
- Rie Cramer (1973)
- Piet en Nel (1975)
