= Francis Jarvis =

Rugby league footballer

Personal information
- Full name: Francis Jarvis
- Born: c1950

Playing information
- Height: 5 ft 10 in (1.78 m)
- Weight: 15 st 1 lb (96 kg)
- Position: Hooker, Second-row, Lock
Club
Years	Team	Pld	T	G	FG	P
1973–78	Bradford Northern
1978–81	Featherstone Rovers	36	6	0	0	18
1981–82	Hunslet RLFC	22	3	0	0	9
1982–83	Halifax	25	1	0	0	3
	Total	83	10	0	0	30
Representative
Years	Team	Pld	T	G	FG	P
1974	Other Nationalities	2	0	0	0	0

Coaching information
Club
Years	Team	Gms	W	D	L	W%
1991	Huddersfield

Francis "Frannie"/"Franny" Jarvis (born c. 1950) is a former professional rugby league footballer who played in the 1970s and 1980s. He played at representative level for Other Nationalities, and at club level for Bradford Northern, Featherstone Rovers, and Halifax, as a hooker, second-row or lock.

== Playing career ==
=== Player's No.6 Trophy Final appearances ===
Francis Jarvis played hooker in Bradford Northern's 3-2 victory over Widnes in the 1974–75 Player's No.6 Trophy Final during the 1974–75 season at Wilderspool Stadium, Warrington on Saturday 25 January 1975.

=== Club career ===
Francis Jarvis made his début for Bradford Northern against Whitehaven at Odsal Stadium on Saturday 3 February 1973, he made his debut for Featherstone Rovers on 20 August 1978, and he played his last match for Featherstone Rovers during the 1980–81 season.

== Administration ==
Francis Jarvis is, as of 2011, the administrator of the rugby league club Undercliffe Wildboars (in Bolton and Undercliffe, Bradford, of the Pennine League).
