= Frances Boyd Calhoun =

American author (1867–1909)

- Born: Frances Boyd; December 25, 1867; Mecklenburg County, Virginia, U.S.
- Died: June 8, 1909 (aged 41); Covington, Tennessee, U.S.
- Burial place: Mumford Cemetery in Covington, Tennessee, U.S.
- Other name: Frannie Boyd
- Occupations: Author, teacher
- Spouse: George Barret Calhoun

Frances Boyd Calhoun (née Boyd; December 25, 1867 – June 8, 1909) was an American writer and teacher in Tennessee. She authored the children's book Miss Minerva and William Green Hill (1909), which has been a publishing success and has gone through more than fifty printed editions. She died four months after its publication.

== Biography ==
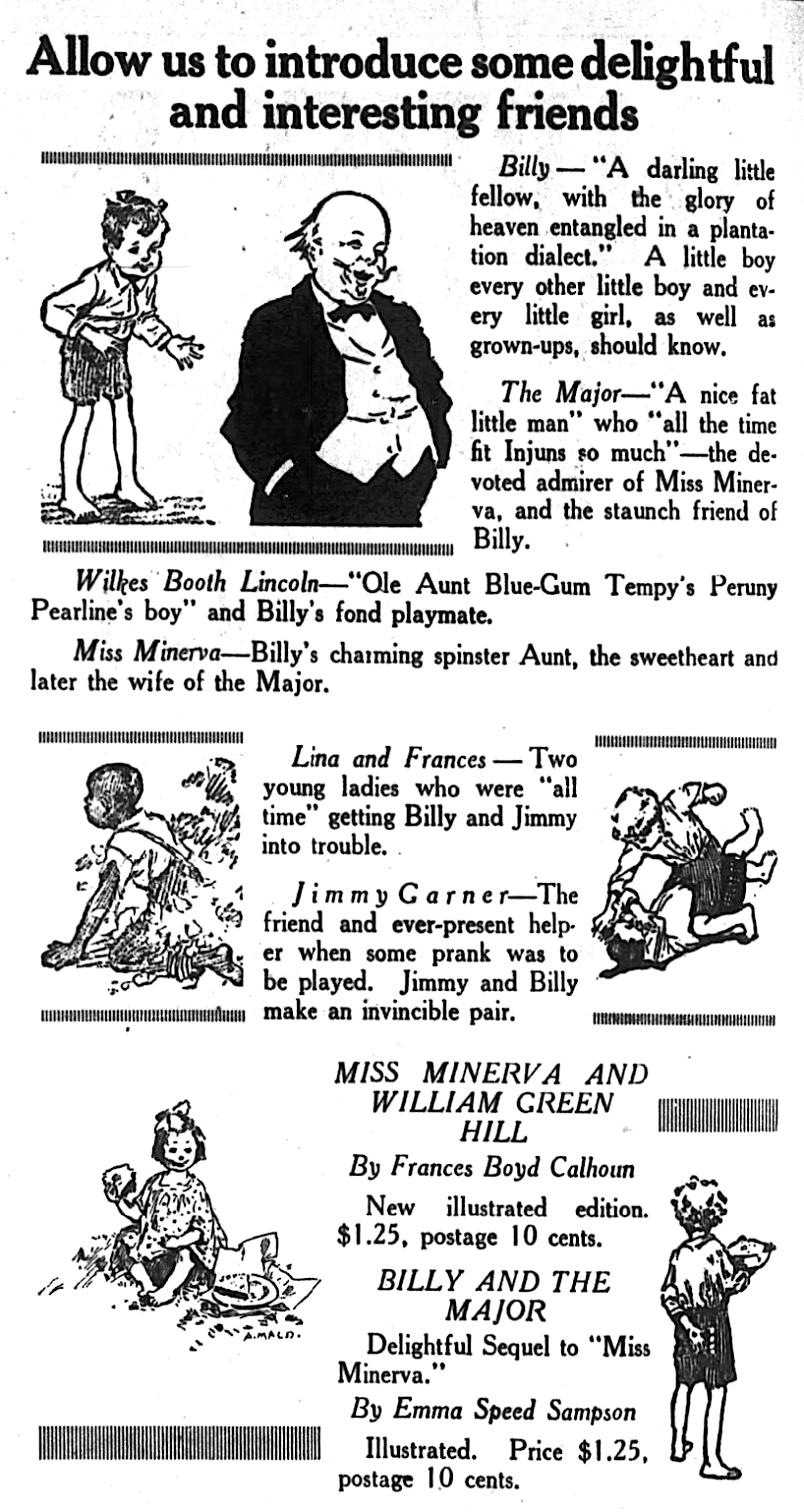
1919 advertisement for books, Miss Minerva and William Green Hill and the sequel Billy and the Major

Frances Boyd was born on December 25, 1867, in Mecklenburg County, Virginia. Her grandfather was a prominent land owned in Occoneechee (now Occoneechee State Park) in Virginia. In childhood she lived in Warrenton, North Carolina, for two years, before moving in 1880 with her family to Covington, Tennessee. She graduated from Tipton Female Academy (also known as Tipton Female Seminary) in 1885.

Her father William Townes Boyd was a newspaper publisher and worked for The Covington Leader, and she wrote for his paper. In 1903, she married George Barret Calhoun, and he died a year later in 1904. For seven years she taught at the local Covington public schools, before she quit due to chronic illness. She was a member of the Daughters of the Confederacy (now United Daughters of the Confederacy), and at some point was a chapter president.

She authored Miss Minerva and William Green Hill (1909), a children's book published by Reilly and Britton (now McGraw-Hill) that became a classic of Southern fiction. The book has a few prominent characters including a spindly old maid named Miss Minerva; her suitor the Major, an obese former Confederate States Army veteran; her nephew "Billy" Hill; and Billy's various friends, African American characters. The depictions of African Americans have them speaking in dialect. The story was said to be based on Calhoun's young next door neighbor of the same name, William Green Hill.

Calhoun also had her poems published. Sequels to her book including Billy and the Major (1918) were written by Emma Speed Sampson.

She died on June 8, 1909, at age 41, and is buried in Mumford Cemetery in Covington. Calhoun never got to see her books successes. A historical marker in Covington by the Tennessee Historical Commission commemorates her life.
