= Frances E. L. Preston =

African-American activist (1844–1929)

- Born: 1844; Richmond, Virginia
- Died: 1929 (aged 84–85); Detroit, Michigan
- Occupation: Lecturer

Frances E. L. Preston (1844–1929) was an American organizer and lecturer for the National Women’s Christian Temperance Union. She served as President of Michigan Federation of Colored Women’s Clubs in the early 20th century.

== Biography ==
Preston was born in Richmond, Virginia, in 1844. Her mother was Louisa Baber, an enslaved woman and her father was John L. Martin, a free man. She moved to Detroit, Michigan, with her parents in 1885.

She was a temperance advocate and traveled across the United States lecturing on the subject for the National Women’s Christian Temperance Union from 1870 to 1890.

From 1900 to 1913, Preston was the President of Michigan Federation of Colored Women’s Clubs.

She died in Detroit in 1929.
