= Women Painting Women =

Art movement

- Abbreviation: WPW
- Formation: 2009
- Type: Art group
- Legal status: Active
- Location: Australia, UK, United States of America
- Region served: Worldwide
- Official language: English
- Website: womenpaintingwomen.blogspot.com//

Women Painting Women (WPW) started off as a blog and turned into a movement that features contemporary women artists painting the female form. The group's name came from the goal of the group, which was to showcase works of women by contemporary women artists.

Starting as a blog in 2009, they were recognized in 2010 by the Robert Lange Studios Gallery, where they held their first exhibition in Charleston, SC. After their beginnings as a blog, the group then went on to hold another 16 exhibitions, three of which were held overseas - two in Australia, and one in the UK. In 2013, they held their first UK exhibition, and in 2016 they held their first exhibition in Australia.

The goal of the exhibitions, as stated by Alia El-Bermani on a blog post with details on WPW: (R)evolution and Call, "is to expand the collective sense of what a woman is and means in the realm of art".

The group has a Facebook page also titled "Women Painting Women", where they share posts and articles relevant to women in the art field, as well as their own videos and photographs of their exhibitions. It has links to each of the founders' respective blogs. A subset of the group, 'Women Drawing Women', is an online exhibition that posts artworks of women by women. It was started in 2010, and since then has come to include a total of 36 artworks as of 2019.

== Influences ==
The group was first started by Alia El-Bermani, Diane Feissel and Sadie Valeri who saw that there was a lack of recognition for contemporary women artists after participating in online discussions where they discovered that there were no resources that catalogued these artists who had women as their subjects. This led to the starting of the blog "Women Painting Women", where they posted artworks of women done by women artists as well as information about current or upcoming exhibitions.

== Blog ==
The blog started as a way to gain recognition for contemporary women artists, who the founding members realised where underappreciated. It contains posts about artworks of women painted by women artists, and also includes information about exhibitions. There are also posts celebrating the achievements of artists who are involved in the Women Painting Women group, as well as links to external articles written on the group and their exhibitions by media outlets.

There are also links to both the websites of the galleries that are hosting the exhibitions and the order link for catalogues of some of the exhibitions. These include the 2017 "Women Painting Women: In Earnest", 2013 "WPW: (R)evolution", 2013 "WPW: (R)evolution An International Juried Exhibition", and 2012 "The Expedition and Beyond". As of 29/4/19, the blog has 1340 followers.

== Artists ==
The artists who are involved in exhibitions are globally based, and although there are some artists who participate in more than one exhibition, the artists in each exhibition vary.

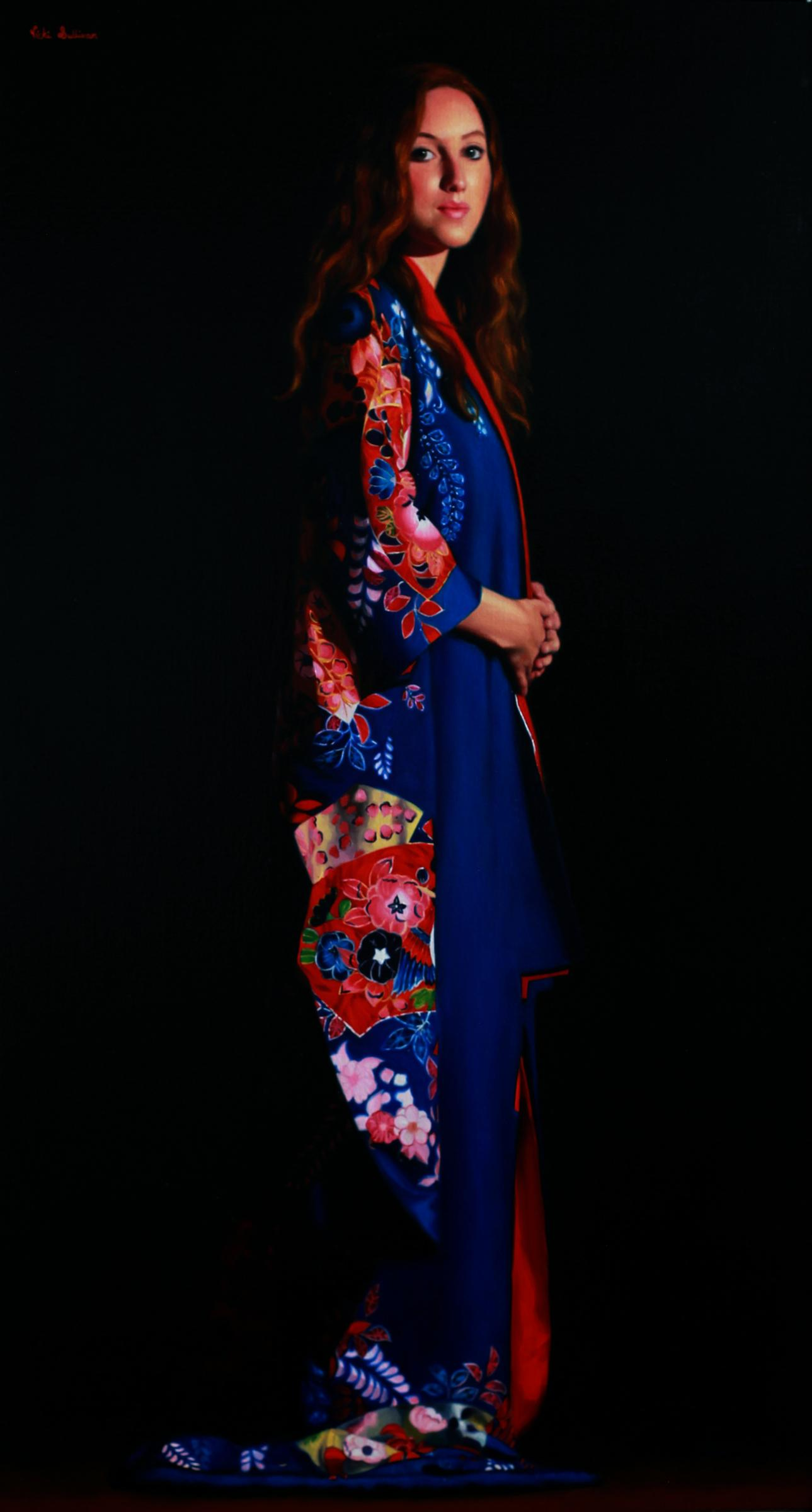
Into the Night - Vicki Sullivan, Women Painting Women Australia (2016)

Aleah Chapin

- 'And We Were Birds, oil on canvas' - Reclamation (2018)
- 'Auntie, oil on canvas' - Reclamation (2018)
- 'The Air Was Full, oil on linen' - Reclamation (2018)
- 'Auntie, 2011' - Women Painting Women: In Earnest (2017)

Alexandra Tyng

- 'The Grandmothers, oil' - Women Painting Women: (R)evolution (2013)

Ali Cavanaugh

- 'Effect, fresco (2015)' - Women Painting Women: In Earnest (2017)

Alia El-Bermani

- 'Simbi, oil on linen' - Women Painting Women (2010)
- 'Space Between, oil on panel' - Women Painting Women (2010)

Alice Neel

- 'Ginny, lithograph print' - Reclamation (2018)
- 'Mother and Child, lithograph print' - Reclamation (2018)

Anna Killian

Ann Kraft Walker

Anna Rose Bain

Andrea Kemp

Andrea Kowch

- 'Fetch (limited edition hand signed print)' - Women Painting Women: A Voice with Vision
- 'Flame (limited edition hand signed print' - Women Painting Women: A Voice with Vision

Anne Nelson Sweat

Avril Thomas

- 'Professor Karen Reynolds, oil on canvas (2012)' - Women Painting Women, Australia (2016)

Brenda Hash

Bryony Bensly

- 'When She Wears Flowers in Her Hair, oil on canvas (2017)' - Women Painting Women: A Voice with Vision

Carmen Mansilla

- 'Myself', oil, - Women Painting Women, 5th Anniversary and International Juried Show, (2014)

Catherine Prescott

- 'Girl With a Mink Pelt, oil on canvas' - Women Painting Women (2010)
- 'Ellen Eagle II, oil' - Women Painting Women: (R)evolution (2013)

Candice Bohannon

- 'Dementia, oil on panel' - Women Painting Women (2010)
- 'Downpour, oil on canvas' - Women Painting Women (2010)
- 'Bear the Light, 2013' - Women Painting Women: In Earnest (2017)

Candice Chovanec

- 'My Mother and Her Daughter, oil on panel (2017)' - Reclamation (2018)

Celeste Ryder

Cindy Procious

Colleen Barry

- 'Woman in Head Scarf, oil on panel' - Reclamation (2018)

Dagmar Cyrulla (VIC)

- 'Dong What a girl has to IV, oil on linen (2016)' - Women Painting Women, Australia (2018)

Daryl Zang

- 'Roots, oil on canvas' - Reclamation (2018)
- 'Wonder, oil on canvas' - Reclamation (2018)

Diane Feissel

- 'Drop, oil on canvas' - Women Painting Women (2010)
- 'The Sightless Surveyor, oil' - Women Painting Women: (R)evolution, 2013
- 'Leaving California 3, oil' - Women Painting Women: (R)evolution (2013)

Dominique Medici

- 'Jaja, oil on panel (2017)' - Reclamation (2018)

Donatella Marcatajo

- 'The Waves, oil on canvas (2017)'

Ellen Cooper

- 'Defiance of Erebus, oil on linen panel' - Reclamation (2018), Women Painting Women: In Earnest (2017)

Ellen Eagle

- 'Pigeon Glancing, 2011' - Women Painting Women: In Earnest (2017)

Erin Anderson

- 'The Candidate, oil on copper (2017)' - Reclamation (2018)

Felice House

Felicia Forte

- 'Going Back, oil' - Women Painting Women: (R)evolution (2013)

Fiona Bilbrough (VIC)

- 'Aquarius, oil on linen (2015)' - Women Painting Women, Australia (2016)

Gaela Erwin

Grace DeVito

Heather Ellis (VIC)

- '4 Girl With Cello, bronze' - Women Painting Women, Australia (2016)

Helen K Beacham

Hung Liu

- 'Cottonfield, mixed media (2017)' - Reclamation (2018)
- 'Xinshi: Messenger, mixed media (2016)' - Reclamation (2018)

Ilaria Rosselli del Turco

Jackee Sandelands-Strom

- 'Rose, acrylic on wood panel (2017)' - Women Painting Women: A Voice with Vision

Jacqui Grantford

- 'Complex Simplicity, oil on linen (2013)' - Women Painting Women, Australia (2016)

Jantina Peperkamp

- 'Vlinder, acrylic on wood (2017)' - Women Painting Women: A Voice with Vision

Janvier Rollande

Jennifer Balkan

- 'Slipping Away, oil on wood' - Women Painting Women (2010)
- 'Queen (2015)' - Women Painting Women: In Earnest (2017)

Jenny Dubnau

- 'MK Pale Ground, oil on canvas (2010)' - Reclamation (2018)

Johnnie Sielbeck

Joyce Tenneson

Judy Takács

- 'Her Humble Opinion,' oil on linen (2013) - Women Painting Women, 5th Anniversary and International Juried Show, (2014)

Karen Maness

Karen Offutt

- 'The Strength Within, oil on board' - Reclamation (2018)
- 'From the Shadows' - Women Painting Women: In Earnest (2017)

Kate Sammons

Kate Savage

Katherine Fraser

- 'Choice and Fate, oil on canvas' - Women Painting Women (2010)

Katherine Stone

Katie O'Hagan

- 'Refuge, oil on linen (2016)' - Women Painting Women: A Voice with Vision
- 'Constriction, oil on linen' - Reclamation (2018)
- 'Suspension, oil on linen' - Reclamation (2018)
- 'Tectonic Shift, oil on linen' - Reclamation (2018)

Kathy Sosa

Kerry Brooks

- 'A Quiet Hour, prismacolor on board' - Women Painting Women (2010)
- 'Ashleigh in Red, prismacolor on board' - Women Painting Women (2010)
- 'Dark One, prismacolor on board' - Women Painting Women (2010)

Krista Smith

- 'Hide, oil and mixed media on canvas' - Women Painting Women: A Voice with Vision

Kyrin Hobson

- 'Innocent, charcoal with wolf's carbon on paper (2016)' - Reclamation (2018)

Lea Colie Wight

Lee Price

- 'Cherry Cheesecake II, oil on linen ' - Women Painting Women (2010)
- 'Self Portrait with Raspberry Sorbet, oil on linen' - Reclamation (2018)

Leslie Adams

- 'The Purity of Imagination and Color, oil (2014)' - Women Painting Women: In Earnest (2017)

Linda Tracey Brandon

Lisa Gloria

- 'Ceres, oil' - Women Painting Women: (R)evolution (2013)

Margaret Bowland

- 'The Artist, oil on linen (2010)' - Reclamation (2018)
- 'Isn't It Romantic, 2011' - Women Painting Women: In Earnest (2017)
- 'Randall Horton "J" Series 1, oil on linen (2017)' - Women Painting Women: A Voice with Vision

Margo Selski

- 'The Milkweed Mermaid's Butterfly Mission, oil on canvas' - Women Painting Women: A Voice with Vision
- 'Mirrored Friendships, oil and beeswax on canvas' - Women Painting Women: A Voice with Vision

Marilyn Szalay

Marina Dieul

Megan Roodenrys (SA)

- 'A Private Place in a Public Life, oil on linen (2013/2014)' - Women Painting Women, Australia (2018)

Melissa Grimes

Milixa Morón

Mia Bergeron

- 'Blue Kimono, oil on panel' - Women Painting Women (2010)

Michelle Doll

- 'Couple, AJK3, 2015' - Women Painting Women: In Earnest, 2017

Michelle Dunaway

Nancy Boren

Nancy Hollinghurst

- 'Engaging the Noose, oil on linen' - Reclamation (2018)

Pamela Wilson

- 'Sever Me, oil and 24K gold leaf on panel' - Women Painting Women: A Voice with Vision
- 'Hologram Girl, oil on canvas (2016)' - Women Painting Women: A Voice with Vision
- 'Darkling Out of True, oil on canvas (2015)' - Women Painting Women: A Voice with Vision

Rachel Constantine

Rachel Moseley

- 'Doughnut Cheerleader, oil on wood panel' - Women Painting Women: A Voice with Vision

Raelene Sharp (VIC)

- 'Sylvia Walton AO (2015)' - Women Painting Women, Australia (2016)
- 'Self Portrait, oil on linen (2013)' - Women Painting Women, Australia (2018)

Renee Foulks

Sadie Valeri

- 'Self-Portrait at 42 in the Studio (With Dog), oil' - Women Painting Women: (R)evolution, 2013

Sally Ryan (NSW)

- 'Dr Catherine Hamlin AC, oil on linen (2013)' - Women Painting Women, Australia (2016)
- 'Yassmin Abdel Magied, oil on linen' - Women Painting Women, Australia (2018)
- 'Lauren, oil on board (2018)' - Women Painting Women, Australia (2018)

Shannon Runquist

Stanka Kordic

- 'Ascension, oil on canvas' - Women Painting Women (2010)

Sharon Allicotti

- 'Angela's Persona, pastel on paper' - Women Painting Women (2010)

Stefani Tewes

- 'Against Beauty, oil on panel' - Women Painting Women (2010)

Stephanie Deshpande

- 'The Fall, oil on linen (2013)' - Women Painting Women: In Earnest (2017)

Susan Lyon

Sylvia Maier

- 'Hawa Bah, Mother of Mohammed Bah, oil on copper (2017)' - Reclamation (2018)
- 'Sybrina Fulton, Mother of Trayvon Martin, oil on copper (2017)' - Reclamation (2018)
- 'Tabitha, 2011' - Women Painting Women: In Earnest, 2017

Susan Lyon

Suzie Baker

Tanja Gant

Tara Juneau

Terry Moore Strickland

- 'Fastlane, oil on canvas' - Women Painting Women (2010)
- 'The Seamstress, oil on canvas over panel' - Women Painting Women: In Earnest (2017)

Vicki Sullivan (VIC)

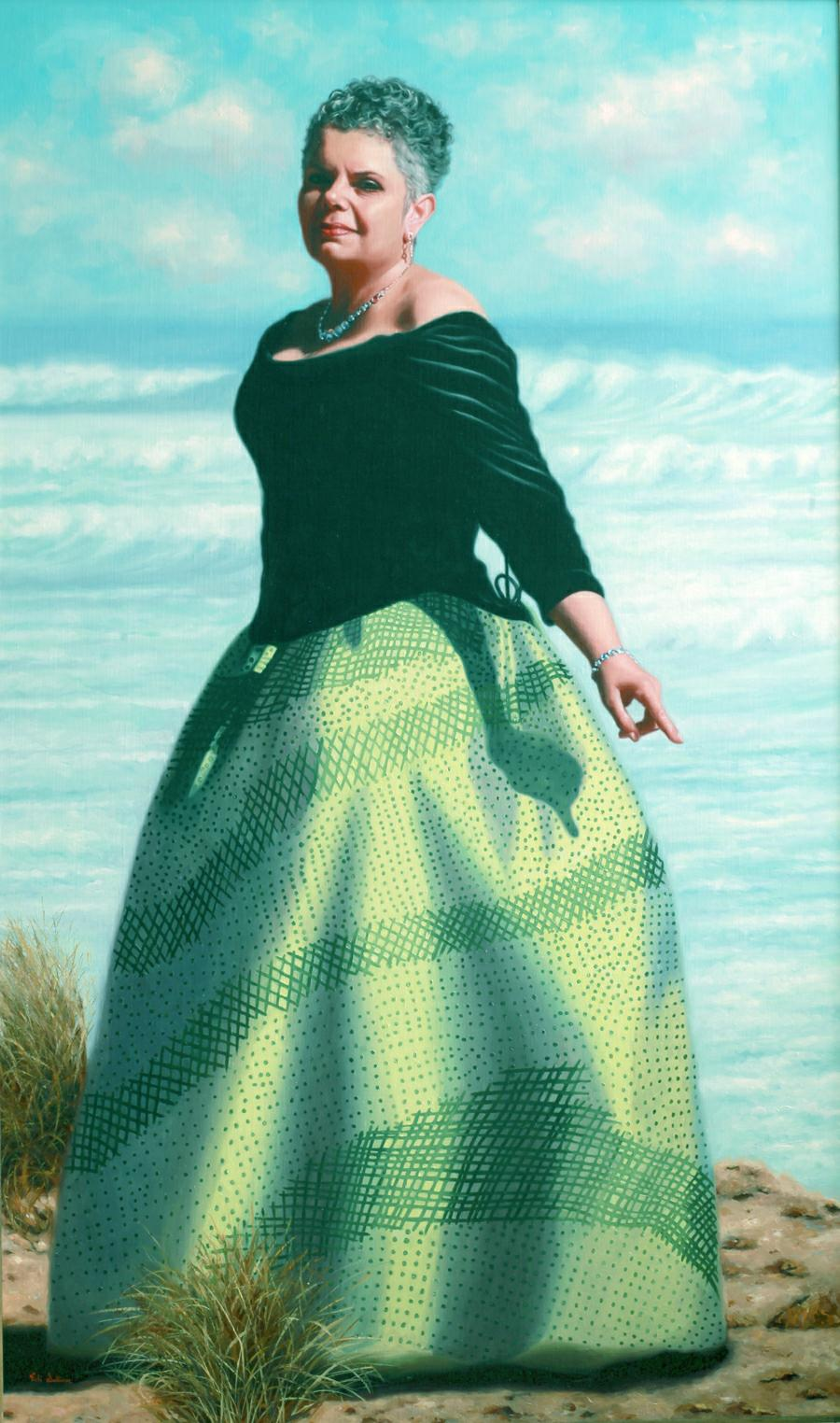
Verismo Vicki Sullivan, Women Painting Women Australia (2018)

- 'Into the Night, oil on Belgian linen (2015)' - Women Painting Women, Australia (2016)
- 'Verismo, oil on linen (2017)' - Women Painting Women, Australia (2018)
- 'Sigrid Thornton, Head Study, oil on linen (2018)' - Women Painting Women, Australia (2018)

Zoey Frank

== Exhibitions ==
=== Exhibitions held in America ===
"Women Painting Women Show" (November 5, 2010), Robert Lange Studios Gallery, Charleston, SC

"Women Painting Women: The Expedition and Beyond" (April 13, 2012), Principle Gallery, Alexandria, VA

"WPW: A Room of One's Own" (August 24 to October 5, 2013), Haynes Gallery, Nashville, TN

"WPW: (R)evolution" (September 7 to 27, 2013), Townsend Atelier, Chattanooga, TN

"WPW: (R)evolution" (September 20 to October 18, 2013), Principle Gallery, Alexandria, VA

"Women Painting Women" (September 21 to November 21, 2013), Richard J Demato Fine Art, Sag Harbor, NY

"WPW: A Universal Alliance" (September 26 to October 26, 2013), Gallery U, Westfield NJ

"Women Painting Women 5 Year Anniversary" (September 5 to 30, 2014), Principle Gallery, Charleston, SC

"WPW Pay It Forward" (September 5 to 30, 2014), Principle Gallery, Alexandria, VA

"Women Painting Women" (September 11 to November 2, 2014), Customs House Museum, Clarksville, TN

"Women Painting Women" (October 11, 2014), Richard J Demato Fine Art, Sag Harbor, NY

"WPW: Texas" (May 29 to July 5, 2015), Georgetown Art Center, Georgetown, TX

"Women Painting Women" (August 11 to October 23, 2016), Customs House Museum, Clarksville, TN

"Women Painting Women" (October 10, 2016), Richard J Demato Fine Art, Sag Harbor, NY

"Women Painting Women: In Earnest" (August 4 to October 2, 2017), Customs, House Museum, Clarksville, TN

- Curated by Alia El-Bermani and Diane Fessel

"Women Painting Women: A Voice with a Vision" (October 7 to November 5, 2017), RJD Gallery, Bridgehampton, NY

"Women Painting Women: In Earnest" (October 18 to December 16, 2017), J.Wayne Stark Galleries at Texas A&M University, College Station, TX

- Curated by Alia El-Bermani and Diane Fessel

"Reclamation" (June 15 to September 8, 2018), Helen Day Art Center, Stowe, VT

- Curated by Rachel Moore, co-curated by August Burns and Diane Fessel

=== Exhibitions held overseas ===
"Women Painting Women" (September 20 to October 8, 2013), Art Exposure Gallery, Glasgow, Scotland, UK

"Women Painting Women" (April 20 to May 29, 2016), Burrinja Cultural Centre, Upwey, Victoria, Australia

"Women Painting Women: In Earnest" (July 21 to August 19, 2018), Burrinja Cultural Centre, Upwey, Victoria, Australia

"Women Painting Women III" (March 6 to April 11, 2021), Burrinja Cultural Centre, Upwey, Victoria, Australia

== Reception and Reviews ==
=== Awards ===
In 2013, the 'Women Painting Women' blog was awarded the 'Best Art Blog Project Virtual Challenge Cup' by Katherine Tyrrell from the 'Making a Mark' blog. In 2013, they were also awarded 'The Art Innovation of the Year Award' for their exhibition 'Women Painting Women: (R)evolution'.

=== Media ===
The blog itself has a page dedicated to a list of women artists and articles written by media outlets about the 'Women Painting Women' exhibitions, including links and images to the articles themselves.
