= Judy Takács =

American contemporary figurative painter

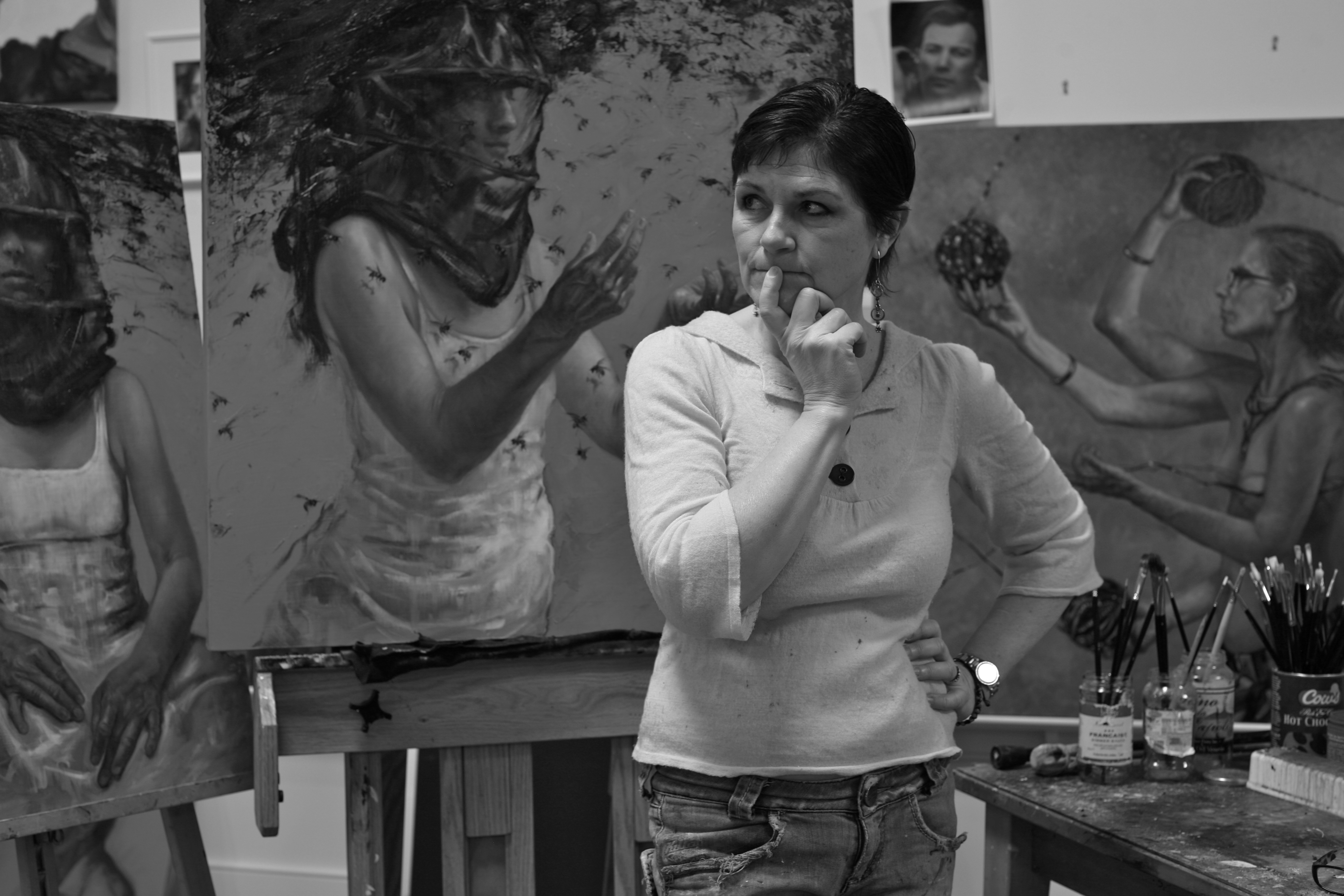
- Judy Takács in her studio
- Born: 1962 (age 63–64). New York City, New York
- Education: Bachelor of Fine Arts
- Movement: Figurative Realism
- Spouse: Scott Pendergast
- Website: judytakacs.com

Judy Takács (born 1962, New York) is a contemporary figurative painter, known for her realistic paintings from her ongoing, traveling portrait series, Chicks with Balls: Judy Takács paints unsung female heroes. “Takács is a figurative artist who tells stories about people who have something uplifting to share.” She is an elected member of, and past Social Media Chair for Allied Artists of America, appointed by artist Gabriela Gonzalez Delosso. She is past Social Media Chair and Literature Committee writer for the Cecilia Beaux Forum, serving under the late Cecilia Beaux Chair, Judith Carducci of the Portrait Society of America. In 2018, Takács was elected to membership in the Salmagundi Art Club and the Catharine Lorillard Wolfe Art Club in New York City. She holds Signature Status with Portrait Society of America, American Women Artists and Akron Society of Artists. She lives and works in Solon, Ohio.

== Biography ==
Takács received her BFA in Illustration and Portrait Painting from the Cleveland Institute of Art in 1986, studying portraiture with José Cintron and life drawing with Francis Meyers.Takács has staged serial projects painting senior citizens and elderly nuns from life. These projects have yielded over fifty paintings, three solo shows, a feature in Anthropology & Aging Quarterly and placements in juried and invitational shows. In 2014 she published a book of these collected portraits of the elderly called, The Age of Adventure.

Takács' work has been recognized by the Portrait Society of America, the Art Renewal Center, the National Arts Club, Cincinnati Arts Club, Allied Artists of America, Catharine Lorillard Wolfe Club, and the Salmagundi Club, NYC. She has participated in Women Painting Women Exhibitions along with Rachel Constantine, Alia El-Bermani, Diane Fiesel and Sadie Valeri, and multiple Poets/Artists publications and live exhibitions. Takács' work is archived at the Artists Archives of the Western Reserve. Her work has been exhibited at the Butler Institute of American Art, the Brookgreen Gardens Zanesville Museum of Art, Evansville Museum, Museum of Contemporary Art Cleveland, Haggin Museum, Wausau Museum of Contemporary Art, Erie Art Museum, Loveland Museum, Museum of American Porcelain Art, Cleveland Museum of Art Transformer Station, Dayton Art Institute and ARTneo. Takács' work is included in the permanent collections of Susquehanna University, Artists Archives of the Western Reserve, and ARTneo.

In 2009 she began both painting and blogging her project; Chicks with Balls: Judy Takács paints unsung female heroes. For this series, she asked her female friends and family to pose topless, holding balls to symbolize their personal challenges. In 2013, Takács authored and published, Chicks with Balls: Judy Takács paints unsung female heroes. and received an Ohio Arts Council Grant for Individual Artistic Excellence in 2013, 2019 for the series which became a traveling exhibition with four solo shows that culminated with her first solo museum show at the Zanesville Museum of Art in February 2020.

In 2014, Takács curated Majority Rising for the Artists Archives of the Western Reserve during Women's History Month. Choosing work from Cleveland figurative artists, Shirley Aley Campbell, Kathleen McKenna, Marilyn Szalay, Lee Heinen and Marsha Sweet. Takács painted and exhibited a portrait of each artist as well. These portraits are in the permanent collection of the Artists Archives of the Western Reserve in Cleveland, Ohio.

In 2015 Takács had her two-artist inaugural exhibition with Marilyn Szalay at the Artists Archives of the Western Reserve. Takács and Szalay were referred to as “two titans of figurative art” in Cleveland Scene Magazine. The exhibition showed 12 works from each artist and was entitled, "Szalay…Takács…Secrets." The theme for the works included, dealt with the concept of hidden meanings in art, some of which go to the grave with the artist.

In 2016 Takács was one of the nine artists, including Stephanie Deshpande, Lauren Tilden, Mario Robinson, and Terry Strickland, who participated in the Emanuel Nine Portrait Project at Principle Gallery, honoring the victims of the Charleston church shooting. She painted a portrait of Rev. Dr. Daniel Simmons Sr.

In 2018, Takács begain painting works for her Goddess Project series, re-imagining the mythology of all the religions through a contemporary feminist lens. The Goddess Project has exhibited two solo shows, The Goddess Project: Innocents, in conjunction with the Ohio Innocence Project at Chagrin Arts in March 2022 and The Goddess Project: Warriors at the Ashtabula Arts Center in July 2023. Works from the project were awarded an Ohio Arts Council Grant for Individual Artistic Excellence in 2023. Takacs published, The Goddess Project: Paintings and Stories by Judy Takács in 2022.

A few years before Roe v. Wade was overturned by the Supreme Court of the United States, on June 24, 2022, Takács was creating and showing Pro-Choice paintings. She won Best in Show awards for MASALA (Make Abortion Safe and Legal Again) at the Akron Society of Artists Juried Exhibition in 2022 and one for BANS Off at the Summit Artspace Kaleidoscope Exhibition in October 2023. Takács' activism included writing Opinion Editorial articles and Letters to the Editor of The Cleveland Plain Dealer. Leading up to 2023 Election Day in Ohio, when the Ohio Reproductive Rights Amendment was on the ballot, Chagrin Arts hosted a show of Takács' Pro Choice works, “Mothers, Women, Children, Choices.” Ultimately her efforts were successful and the Ohio Reproductive Rights Amendment passed, securing abortion rights in the Ohio Constitution. In March, 2024 Takács wrote a book chronicling this statewide effort against the backdrop of her art and activism, “My Weapon of Choice: Judy Takács Paints Reproductive Rights.”

Takács' artistic political activism continued with a 2026 constitutional themed solo exhibition for the Semi-quincentennial. “We the People…All the People,” was presented by non-profit organization, Arts for Justice Cleveland at the Midtown Collaboration Center in Cleveland, Ohio The anchor piece in the exhibition is a 12-canvas polyptych that inspired the name of the show. It features children, real and symbolic, to represent the most vulnerable in society whom the U.S. Constitution is meant to protect. Erin Hollenbank in CAN Journal writes, "Among the twelve portraits that encompass We the People…All the People, we see a child holding the banned book, Fahrenheit 451, five-year-old Liam Conejo Ramos wha was detained by ICE while wearing his infamous bunny hat, a young African-American boy who was killed by police during a mental health episode, two Iranian girls killed by an American bomb and the outspoken Epstein victim Virginia Giuffre as a young girl" in the portrait titled, Redacted at 13.

Takács' father is Queueing theory pioneer, Lajos Takács and her mother, is the author Dalma Takács.

== Art ==
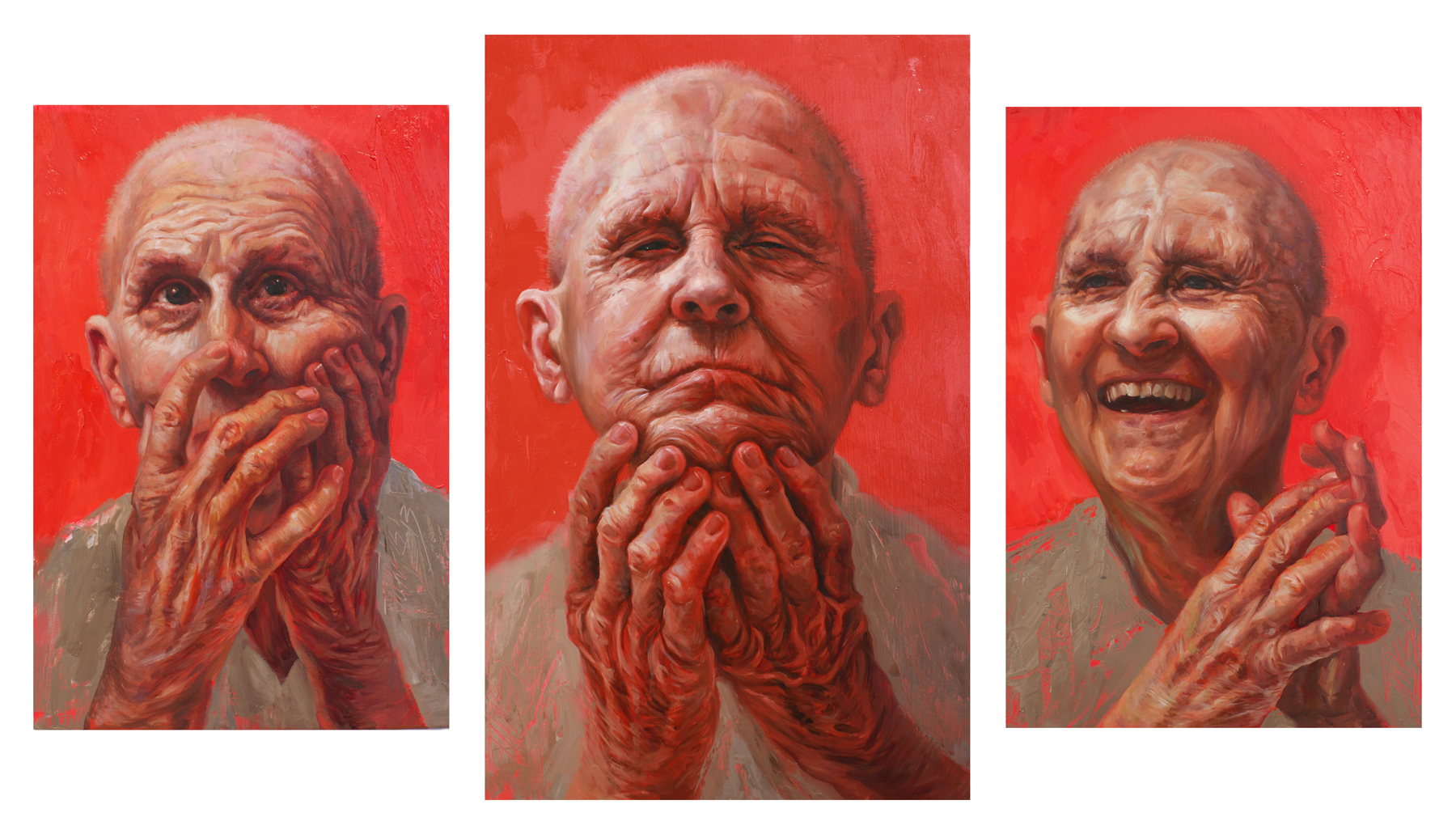
Cancer Honeymoon

Takács' painting, Cancer Honeymoon depicts Takács’ mother, Dalma Takács during the early stages of ovarian cancer. She continues this theme with her paintings, Guardian Angel of the Good Death and Serenity Prayer and the Ephemera Collector Series.

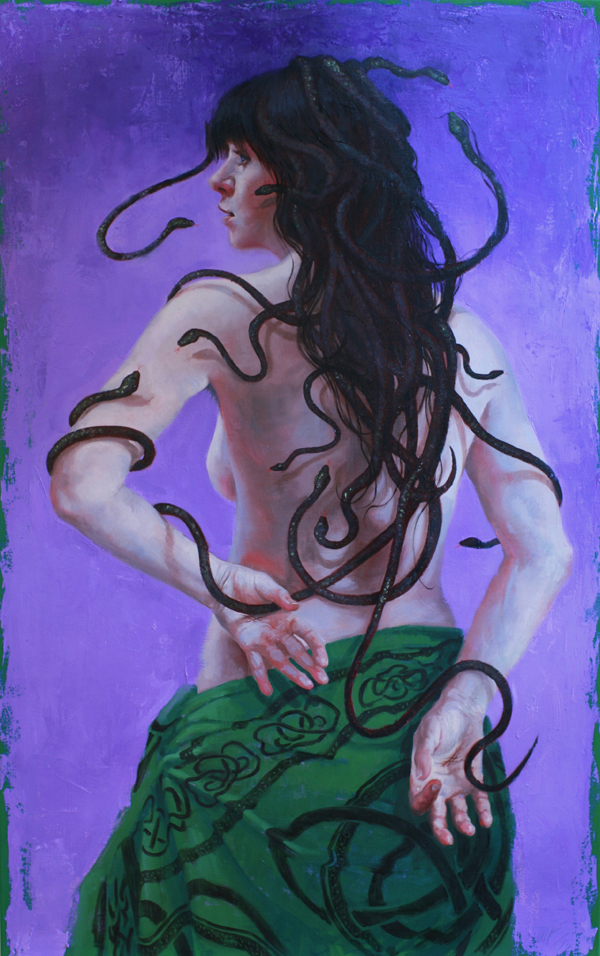
#Me(dusa)too, oil on canvas, Judy Takács

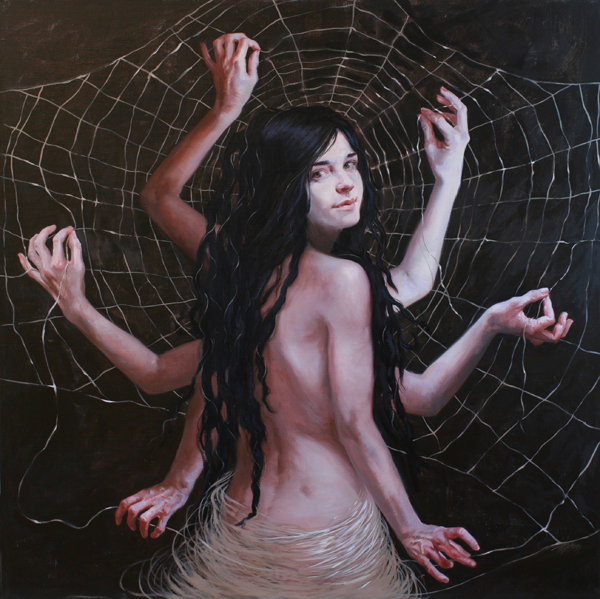
Arachne, Predator and Prey, Judy Takács, oil on canvas, 2018

#Me(dusa)too, oil on canvas, 2018. From The Goddess Project; before she was a hideous, snake-headed gorgon, Medusa was a beautiful young rape victim. Goddess Athena turned her into the monster whose glance turns men to stone for the crime of being raped by God Poseidon in Athena's temple.

Arachne, Predator and Prey, oil on canvas, 2018. From The Goddess Project, another victim of Athena's wrath, Arachne was a superior weaver who bested the Goddess in a weaving competition; for which she was turned into a spider.

The Pledge, oil on canvas with collage, 2023. A Pro Choice painting from a larger series created by Judy Takács in response to the Supreme Court of the United States overturning Roe v. Wade, June 24, 2022.

== Bibliography ==
- My Weapon of Choice: Judy Takács paints Reproductive Rights, April 2024, blurb.com
- The Goddess Project: Paintings and Stories by Judy Takács, March 2022, blurb.com
- Beautiful Bizarre Magazine, March 2021, Issue 32, Judy Takács and Shana Levenson: Artist to Artist, Armidale, Australia
- The Artists Magazine, September 2018, A Happy Medium: Judy Takács, Grand Prize Winner in the All Media Art Competition, F-W Media, Inc., Cincinnati, Ohio
- Poets/Artists Sight Unseen, February 2016, Didi Menendez, with curator Alia El-Bermani, Poets/Artists, Chicago, Illinois
- The Archives Speak, November 2014, Rota Sackerlotzky and Roger Welchans, The Artists Archives of the Western Reserve, Cleveland, Ohio
- Age of Adventure: Judy Takács paints the retired and inspired, August 2014, Judy Takács, blurb.com, Cleveland, Ohio
- Women Painting Women, September 2014. Matter Deep Publishing, Principle Gallery, South Carolina
- Art Renewal Center International Salon Catalog 2013/14. August 2014
- Present Tense: Contemporary Art in Ohio, Artists of Rubber CIty. November 2014.
- Manifest Gallery International Painting Annual 3. January 2014. Manifest Gallery, Cincinnati, Ohio
- Chicks with Balls: Judy Takács paints unsung female heroes, August 2013, blurb.com
- Solon Senior Project: Judy Takács paints fascinating wisdom, November 2012, blurb.com

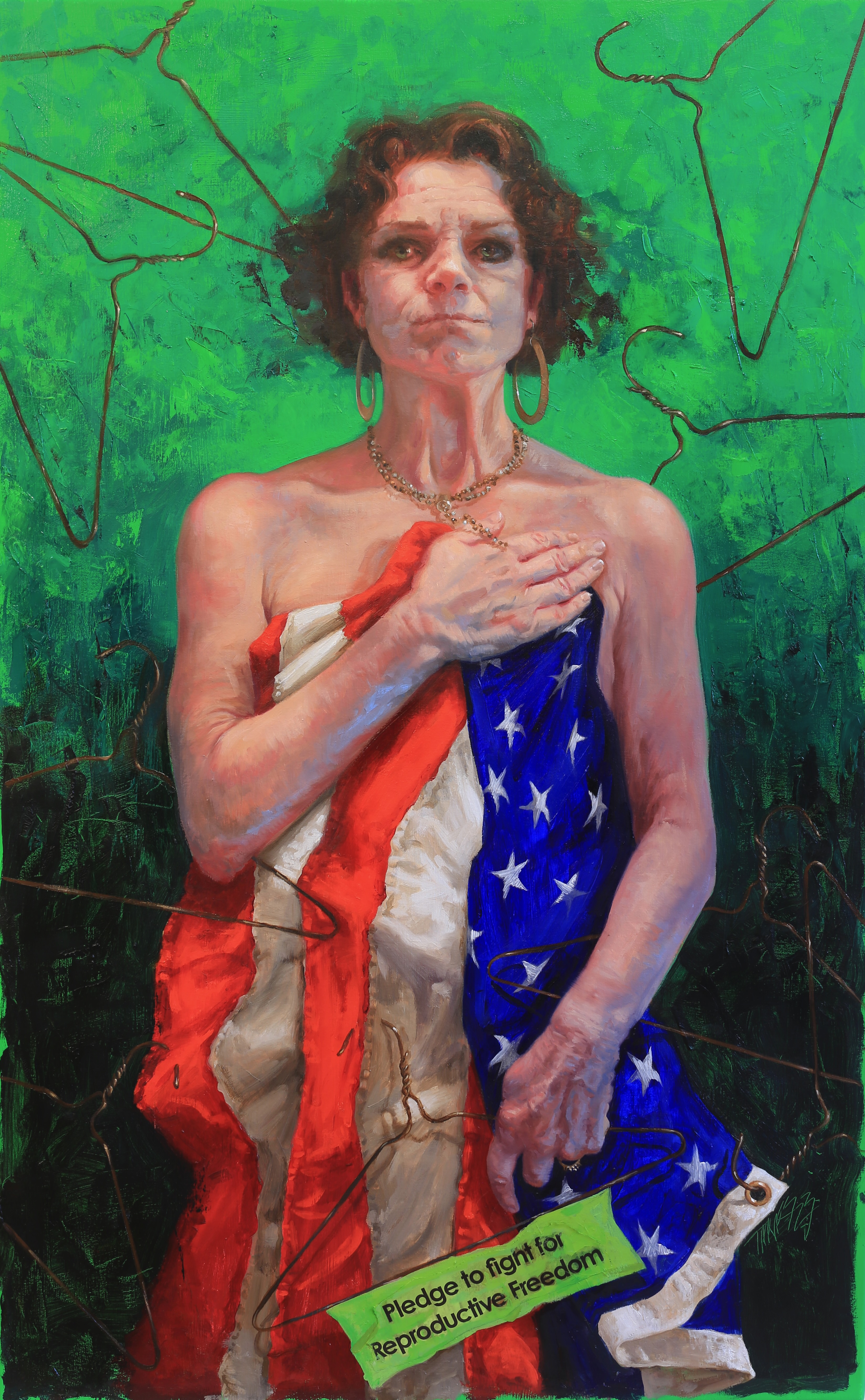
The Pledge, Judy Takács, oil on canvas with collage, 2023

== See also ==
- The Kitsch Movement
- Post-contemporary
- Contemporary Realism
