= Keilson =

Keilson is a surname. Notable people with the surname include:

- Grete Keilson (1905–1999), German politician
- Hans Keilson (1909–2011), German-Dutch novelist, poet, psychoanalyst and child psychologist
- Julian Keilson (1924–1999), American mathematician
