= Shirley Campbell =

Shirley Campbell may refer to:

- Shirley Aley Campbell, (1925–2018), American painter of the Contemporary Figurative Realism movement
- Shirley Campbell Barr, (born 1965), Afro-Costa Rican activist and poet
