= Ryszard Syski =

Polish-American mathematician

- Born: April 8, 1924; Płock, Poland
- Died: June 11, 2007 (age 83); Silver Spring, Maryland, United States
- Education: Polish University Abroad; University of London; University of Maryland College Park
- Scientific career
- Fields: Queueing theory
- Workplaces: University of Maryland College Park

Ryszard Syski (April 8, 1924 in Płock, Poland - June 11, 2007 in Silver Spring, Maryland) was a Polish-American mathematician whose research was in queueing theory.

During World War II he was in the Armia Krajowa with his parents, partaking in the Warsaw Uprising, being imprisoned in Lamsdorf, Silesia and Bavaria (1944), and joining the Polish Second Corps for fights in Italy (1945).

His studies in mathematics started in London, at the Polish University Abroad (1946). He joined Automatic Telephone and Electric Co. in London (1952). He got his B.Sc. (1954) and Ph.D. (1961) at University of London, on the dissertation Stochastic Process in Banach space and its Applications to Congestion Theory.

Encouraged by Thomas L. Saaty he moved to College Park, Maryland, joining the mathematics faculty of University of Maryland (1961–1999), founded the journal Stochastic Processes and their Applications (1973) and was fellow of the Institute of Mathematical Statistics. Syski wrote over forty journal articles, often collaborating with notables such as Félix Pollaczek, Lajos Takács, Julian Keilson and Wim Cohen. Syski died of complications from a brain injury received during a fall.

== Books ==
- Introduction to congestion theory in telephone systems (North-Holland, 1960)
- Passage times for Markov chains (1992)
