= Stephanie Deshpande =

American painter

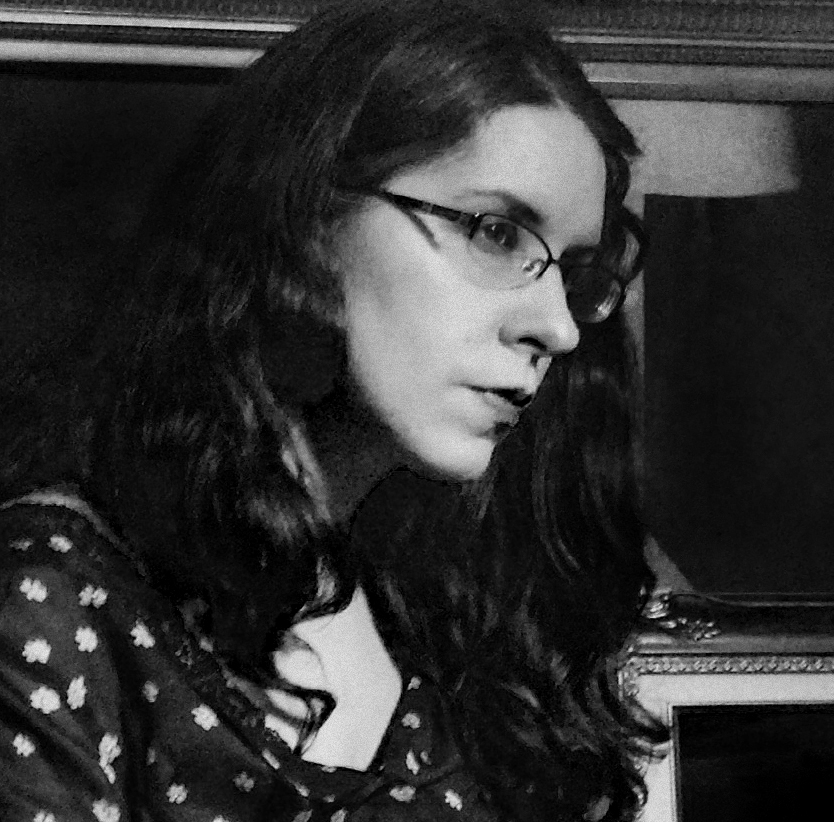
- Born: 1975 (age 50–51). United States
- Known for: Realism
- Website: www.stephaniedeshpande.com

Stephanie Deshpande (born 1975) is a contemporary American painter, best known for her portraits and narrative paintings. She currently lives in northern New Jersey.

== Education ==
Deshpande attended high school in Massachusetts, and completed a BFA with honors in painting at the University of Massachusetts at Amherst in 1997. In 1996 she studied at the Ingbretson Studio in Framingham and was instructed in the Boston School method by Meg Mercier. She was awarded the Ellen Battell Stoeckel Fellowship to attend the Yale Summer School of Music and Art in 1996. She continued her studies at the New York Academy of Art, earning her MFA in 1999. While attending NYAA, she studied under Vincent Desiderio and Steven Assael. She is an instructor at the Visual Arts Center of New Jersey and at the Teaching Studios of Art on Long Island.

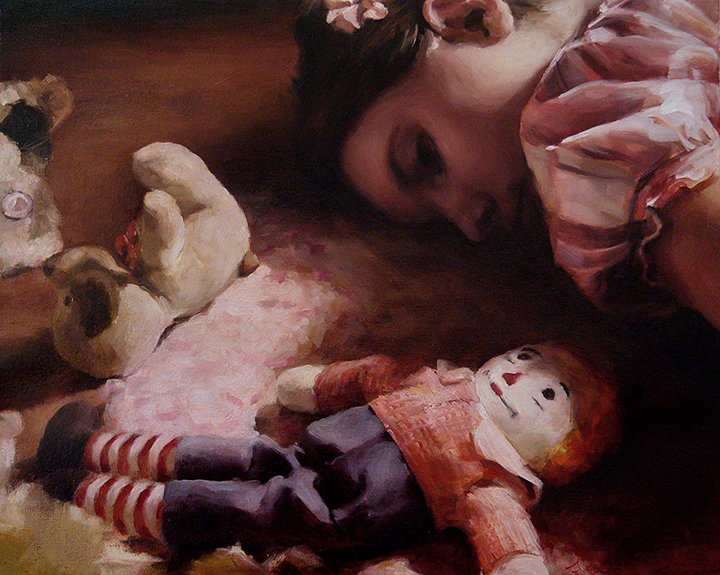
The Fall

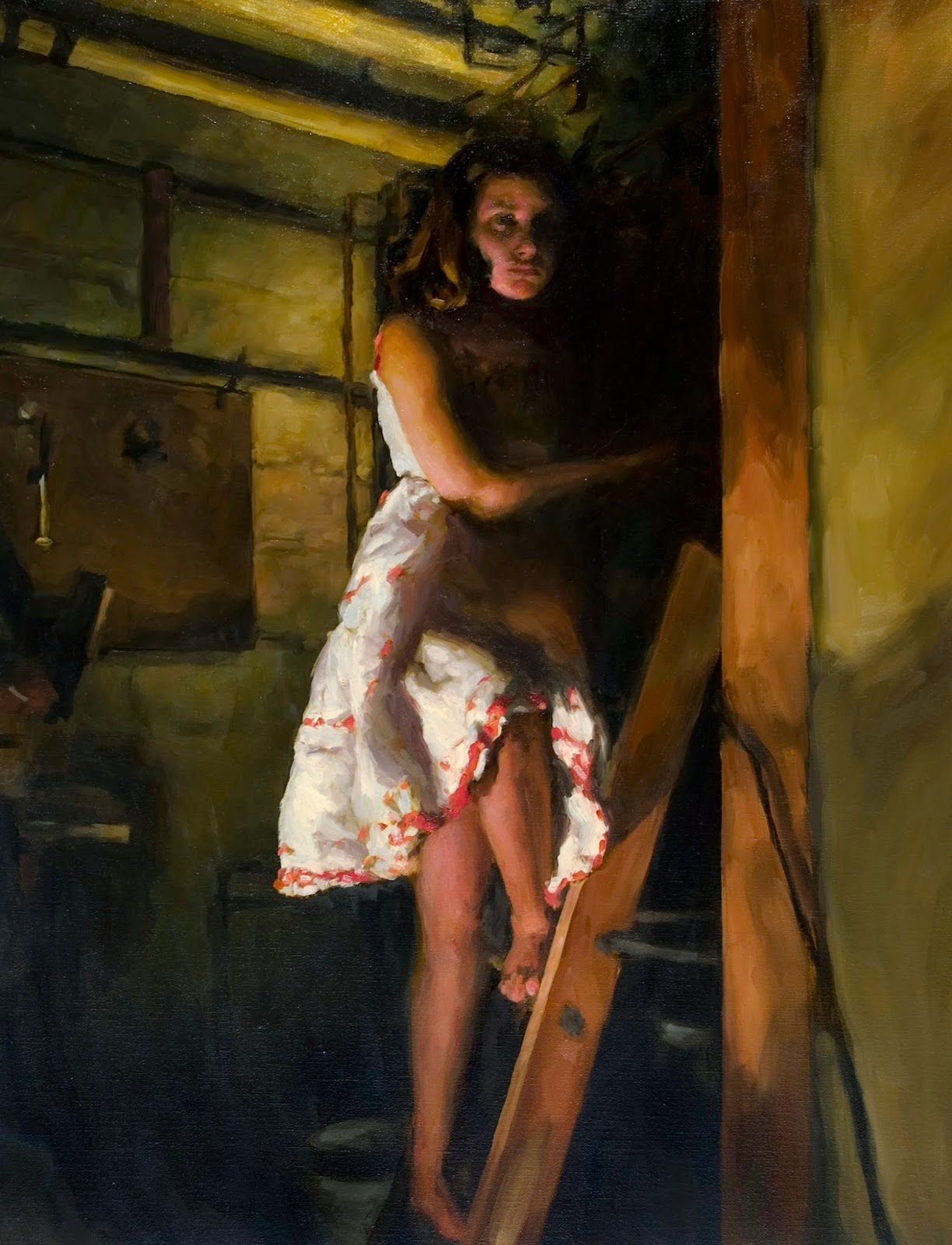
Exploring the Basement

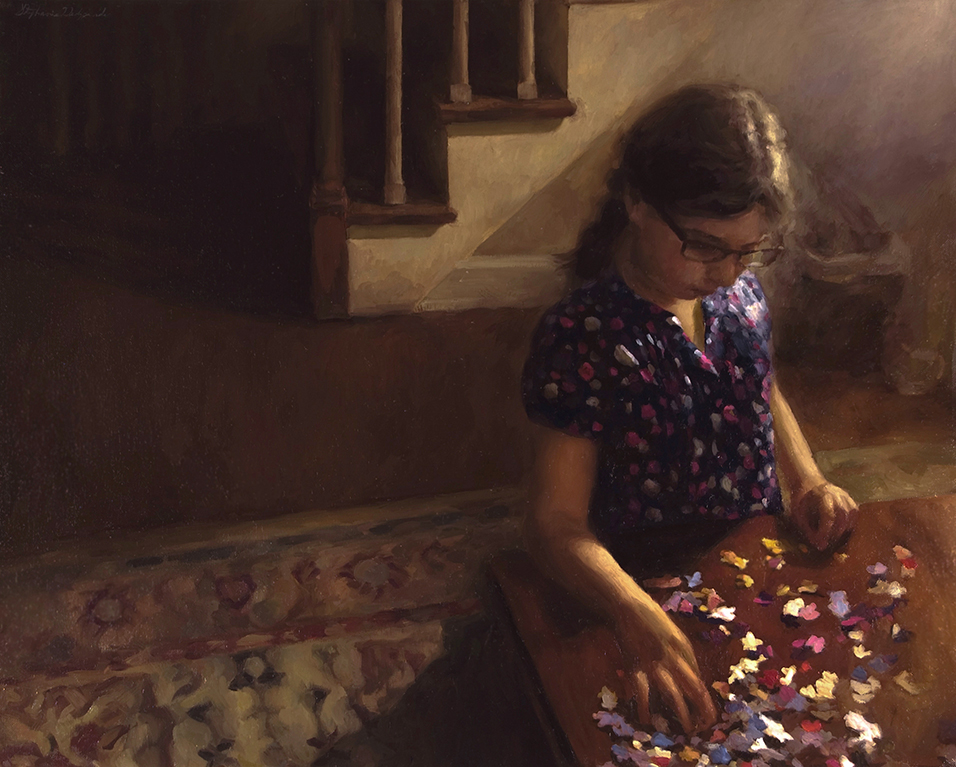
Assembling the Pieces

== Biography ==
Deshpande is involved in promoting recognition of women in the arts. From 2016-2018 she chaired the New Media Relations committee of the Portrait Society of America's Cecilia Beaux Forum. Her articles about the importance of classical training in the arts have appeared in Artists on Art Magazine and on the Cecilia Beaux Forum blog. Her work has been included in several Women Painting Women gallery shows and in the Women Painting Women: In Earnest museum exhibition which traveled from the Clarksville-Montgomery County Museum in Tennessee to the J. Wayne Stark Galleries at Texas A&M University.

Deshpande has received recognition for her paintings by the Portrait Society of America, the Catharine Lorillard Wolfe Art Club, the Art Renewal Center, Allied Artists of America, and Oil Painters of America. Her work has appeared in publications including Poets and Artists Magazine, Fine Art Connoisseur, American Art Collector, The Artist's Magazine, Artists on Art, Artists Network, Southwest Art, and International Artist. Her paintings have been shown nationally in juried and invitational exhibitions in New York, New Jersey, Florida, South Carolina, and California. In 2019, her paintings were shown internationally at the MEAM in Barcelona, Spain as part of the Painting Today – International Women’s Day exhibition. In 2021, she was also included in the exhibition, Women Painting (All Over the World), at the MEAM. Her work is included in the permanent collection of the New Britain Museum of American Art and the Cynthia Graham Hurd St. Andrews Library in Charleston, South Carolina. She is represented by Haynes Galleries in the United States and by Arundel Contemporary in West Sussex, England.

Deshpande's work is included in The Peregrine Collection, "a time capsule to be archived on the moon via Astrobotic's Peregrine Lunar Lander. Launching 4th quarter 2021 on United Launch Alliance's Vulcan Centaur rocket." Her work appears in four issues of Poets Artists: Issue 100 Figurative Realism, Issue 68/ Goss 183 (2015) Devotion, Goss 183 (2018) Sight Unseen, and Goss 183 (2018) Miniatures. The collection is part of the third payload called Annex 9. It contains art files of 800 creatives on a memory card with space reserved by Dr. Samuel Peralta.

== Art ==
Deshpande works in oil, painting figures, portraits, narratives, florals and still lifes. She often uses chiaroscuro to create a dramatic tone in her paintings. Her work is inspired by John Singer Sargent, and deals with personal allegorical themes.Her depiction of female characters is realistic and focuses more on an internal dialog than on the external beauty of her subjects. Her themes often include playing cards, games, electricity, light/shadows, dolls, children, religion, and the dynamics between people. In The Fall (2013), Deshpande explores darker themes inspired by life and dreams. Using a predominantly warm palette and closely related values in The Fall was a choice Deshpande made to "up" the thematic intensity but also to establish the figure as having an equal part in the narrative as the child's toys. The young girl in the painting is Deshpande's daughter. It is an intimate scene Deshpande imagined one day in the car, but it is also slightly sinister, made all the more so by Deshpande's other inspiration for the painting—a nightmare in which she witnessed a child falling to the ground (that child is represented by Raggedy Andy).

In 2016, Deshpande was one of the nine artists, including Mario Robinson, Judy Takács, Laur Tilden, and Terry Strickland, who participated in the Emanuel Nine Portrait Project at Principle Gallery, honoring the victims of the Charleston church shooting. She painted the portrait of Myra Thompson, one of the nine victims. In 2018, Deshpande was commissioned to paint a portrait of Cynthia Graham Hurd to be displayed permanently in the Cynthia Graham Hurd St. Andrews Library Branch in Charleston, South Carolina.

== Awards ==
- 2019, Silver Medal, 2019 Eastern Regional Juried Exhibition of Traditional Oils, Oil Painters of America
- 2018, Grand Prize, 2018 Online Exhibition for Associates, Allied Artists of America
- 2018, Signature Status, Portrait Society of America
- 2015, Allied Artists of America Silver Medal of Honor, Allied Artists of America
- 2015, Award winner, 8th Annual Fine Art Competition, RayMar Art
- 2014, 1st Merit, Non-Commissioned Portrait, Member’s Only Competition, PSoA
- 2014, American Artist Professional League Award, CLWAC 118th Annual Open Exhibition
- 2014, John Young-Hunter Memorial Award for Painting, Allied Artists of America
- 2014, Honorable Mention for painting in Artist’s Magazine’s 30th Annual Art Competition
- 2014, June Best of Show, RayMar Art Competition
- 2014, ARC Staff Prize, 2013/2014 ARC International Salon, Art Renewal Center
- 2012, Honorable Mention for painting in Artist’s Magazine’s 29th Annual Art Competition
- 2012, Best in Show, Images 2012: The Juried Exhibition of the Central Pennsylvania Festival of the Arts, Robeson Gallery, PA

== See also ==
- Classical Realism
- Kitsch movement
- Post-contemporary
- Contemporary realism
