= Marilyn Szalay =

American painter (1950–2012)

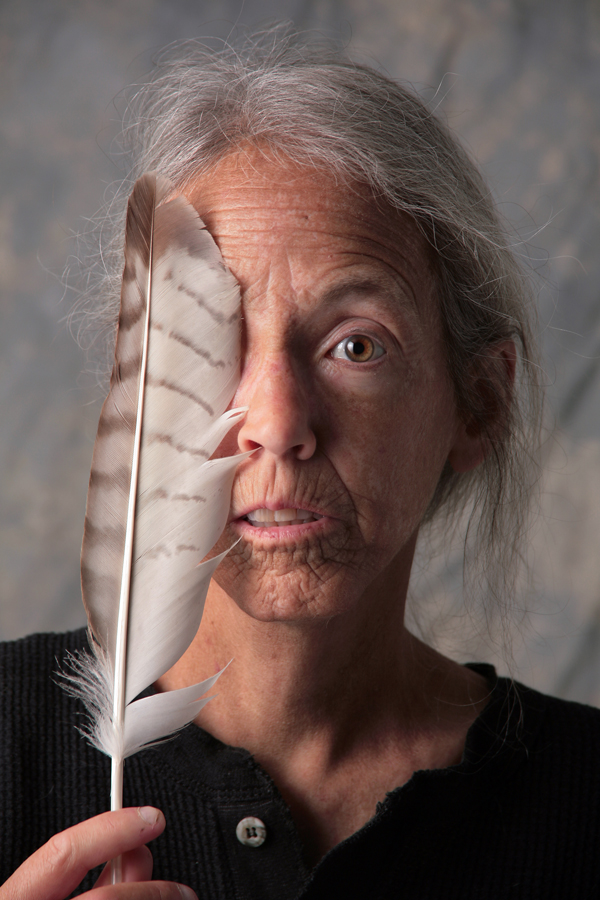
- Born: January 20, 1950; Cleveland, Ohio, U.S.
- Died: November 3, 2012 (aged 62); Lakewood, Ohio, U.S.
- Education: Bachelor of Fine Arts, Master of Fine Arts
- Known for: Realism
- Movement: Contemporary Figurative Realism
- Website: marilynszalay.myartsonline.com

Marilyn Szalay (1950-2012) was a contemporary figurative realist painter and draftsperson. Best known for her oversized charcoal drawings of humans and animals, her aesthetic came from journalistic photography and her work relies on strong draftsmanship and powerful compositions with great psychological depth. Hellen Cullinan of the Cleveland Plain Dealer said of Szalay's work, "Powerfully expressive gestural and facial closeup details reflect Szalay's command of behavioral and physical characteristics."

For the span of her almost 40 year career as a fine artist, Szalay was an instructor of life drawing at every major art institution in Northeast Ohio.

== Education ==
Marilyn Szalay, born in Cleveland, Ohio grew up and attended Magnificat High School in Rocky River, Ohio. She earned her Bachelor of Fine Arts in 1972 and Master of Fine Arts in 1975 from the Kent State University

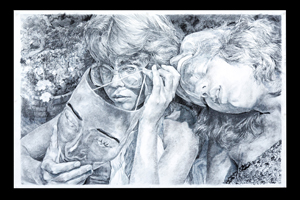
Childhood Dreams Marilyn Szalay Collection of Artists Archives of the Western Reserve

== Quote ==
Szalay's art style has been praised by curators: “I am floored by the depth of form she achieves in charcoal, and love that her figures are larger than life size. Using only shades of gray, she models a face to come all the way out beyond the picture plane. And then she continues the construction and places a beautifully sculpted three-dimensional nose to sit on it.”

Judy Takács, Curator for “Majority Rising: Cleveland's Female Gaze”, Artists Archives of the Western Reserve,

== Biography ==
After matriculating with a BFA and MFA from Kent State University, Marilyn Szalay began her art career in the late 1970s as a photo journalist for the Sun Newspapers in Cleveland, Ohio. She maintained a purity and integrity for the art form of traditional 35mm black and white photography, processing and printing her own film and enlargements in her home darkroom. Always working on location with natural light, she rarely used a flash and never made enhancements and corrections in the darkroom. A stickler for the integrity of the rectangular view she composed in the camera viewfinder, she wouldn't even crop an image in the darkroom.

Her photographic compositions were also psychologically compelling. Photographer, Dave Dreimiller writes:

“Technically Lynn was a master of light and shadow as well as composition. But there was something much deeper in her photos. They often captured a mood that seemingly reflected her mental state at that moment. Lynn was conflicted and you can read this in her images: sometimes soft and gentle, other times ripped by a feeling of stark grittiness. Her photos often evoked darkness and ultimately sadness; full of emotion yet utterly devoid of joy or happiness. The use of run down old buildings as backdrops further accentuated the forlorn quality in her images. An enduring aspect of Lynn's work was the ability to fit the facial expression and pose of her model with its environment. It provides a sense that the subject somehow belongs there, and makes the images feel more cohesive. One can see this time and again in Lynn's work.”

Her photographic sensibilities influenced her large scale charcoal drawings. Her process began with an 8 x 10 photograph she had taken as reference for the drawing. She would draw the composition on paper without use of grids, projection or a transfer process. From that point she would, as Dave Dreimiller writes, “define contours and fill in tones […] Work on this drawing went on night and day until it was completed. The finished drawing had even greater impact than the original photo. The sheer size was impressive, and the drawing somehow conveyed more depth and dimension than the photograph from which it was based.”

Her work has been exhibited at the Cleveland Museum of Art, Cleveland Institute of Art, Butler Institute of American Art, Erie Art Museum, Case Western Reserve University, Canton Art Museum, SPACES, John Carrol University, Mount Union College, and the Cleveland Clinic.

Szalay has participated in the Lakeland Community College annual “from WOMAN” exhibitions during her lifetime and posthumously. In 2013, the "from WOMAN VI" exhibition was dedicated to Marilyn Szalay by curator Mary Urbas, who used her drawing, "Self-Portrait with Frog" on the poster. Urbas, who has also consistently exhibited Szalay's work in her bi-annual Skull and Skeleton Show describes Szalay as “incredibly prolific.”

Szalay's drawings have won awards from the Butler Institute of American Art., Jewish Community Center and The Cleveland Museum of Art Cleveland May Show

Szalay's work is part of the permanent collections of MetroHealth Medical Center, Akron Children's Hospital, The Plain Dealer Publishing Company, The Cleveland Zoological Society, Kent State University, The Jewish Community Center and Ronald Macdonald House.

In 2014 Marilyn Szalay’s work was permanently archived in the collection of The Artists Archives of the Western Reserve. The Artists Archives is an archival facility and regional museum that preserves representative bodies of work created by Ohio visual artists and, through ongoing research, exhibition and educational programs, actively documents and promotes this cultural heritage for the benefit of the public.

Her work was curated posthumously by Judy Takács into the Artists Archives of the Western Reserve group exhibition, "Majority Rising: Cleveland's Female Gaze" along with the work of Shirley Aley Campbell, Kathleen McKenna, Lee Heinen and Marsha Sweet. This exhibition was also featured in the Collective Arts Network (CAN) Journal and in Cleveland Scene Magazine.

Her work was published by American Artist Magazine in 2000 as part of "Realism Today," a national juried competition with a physical show was at the John Pence Gallery in San Francisco. She was regularly featured in "Dialogue, An Art Journal" from 1985 to 1983, and her work was reviewed multiple times by the Cleveland Plain Dealer. Her charcoal drawings were featured on the Women Drawing Women online journal, a subset of the Women Painting Women Movement.

During her 40 years as a figurative artist, Marilyn Szalay was a life drawing instructor at each major art and educational institution in Northeast Ohio, including Kent State University, Cuyahoga Community College, Virginia Marti College of Fashion and Art, Cooper School of Art, Cleveland State University and Cleveland Institute of Art. Her reputation as a tough teacher who didn't mince words, was chronicled by a student, Brian W. Fairbanks, to whom she taught life drawing at Cuyahoga Community College. Fairbanks writes, “Life Drawing went exceptionally well today. Not once did the teacher berate or mock my drawings, as she is often inclined to do.” – Journal entry, Tuesday February 2, 1990.

== Art ==
Tangible and Intangible and Childhood Dreams are characteristic of Szalay's work in that they portray young children in psychologically complex settings. Masks, dolls, skulls and horns are common motifs in her charcoal drawings, as are settings in playgrounds and cemeteries.

Timmy is a portrait of a mountain gorilla, representative of Szalay's work with the Cleveland Metroparks Zoo as an artist, volunteer and docent. In 1993, Plain Dealer critic Helen Cullinan praised Szalay's drawings of a chimpanzee, orangutan and gorilla for the Cleveland Metroparks Zoo: “Powerfully expressive gestural and facial closeup details reflect Szalay’s command of behavioral and physical characteristics.”

== Selected exhibitions ==
- Majority Rising, Cleveland’s Female Gaze, curated by Judy Takács, Artists Archives of the Western Reserve, Cleveland, Ohio, 2015
- From Woman VI (Dedicated to Marilyn Szalay) VII, VIII, IX and X, curated by Mary Urbas, Lakeland Community College, Kirtland, Ohio
- Three Visions, curated by Mary Urbas, Negative Space Gallery, Cleveland, Ohio
- Hungarians at the Easel, invitational show, Cleveland Artists Foundation, Cleveland, Ohio, 2003
- Drawings, Massillon Museum, Massillon, Ohio, 2003
- Annual Midyear Juried Show, 1999, 2001 Awarded, 2003, Butler Institute of American Art, Youngstown, Ohio
- Marilyn Szalay Drawings, solo show, Lakeland Community College, Kirtland, Ohio 1997
- May Show, Cleveland Museum of Art, Cleveland, Ohio, 1985 Awarded, 1986, 1990
- Mauersberger and Szalay, duo show, Cuyahoga Community College, Cleveland, Ohio 1987
- Drawings, Traveling Exhibition; SPACES, Cleveland, Ohio; Contemporary Art Center, Cincinnati, Ohio; Southern Ohio Museum and Cultural Center, Portsmouth, Ohio, 1984

== Awards ==
- 2001 Juror's Mention Award, 65th Annual Midyear Juried Show, Butler Institute of American Art, Youngstown, Ohio
- 1992 Simpson Award of Excellence, Gorilla Giver Brochure, Cleveland, Ohio
- 1990 Purchase Award, Jewish Community Center, Cleveland, Ohio
- 1989 Cash Award, Six State Photography
- 1987 Purchase Award, A New Generation of Ohio Artists
- 1985 Cash Award for Graphics, May Show, Cleveland Museum of Art, Cleveland, Ohio

== Publications ==
- Women Drawing Women, “Marilyn Szalay”, September 14, 2011
- American Artist Magazine, "Realism Today", November 2000
- University of Akron Catalog, "Drawing in Ohio at the Turn of the Century", 1995
- Pilgrim Press Daily Calendar, "In Good Company", 1996, 1997
- The Plain Dealer, Cleveland, Ohio, June 1985, January 9, 1986, September 14, 1986, November 5, 1986, July 1993
- Dialogue: An Art Journal, May/June 1981, March/April 1984, January/February 1986, May/June 1986, November/December 1986

== Selected permanent collections ==
- MetroHealth Medical Center, Cleveland, Ohio
- Akron Children's Hospital, Akron, Ohio
- The Plain Dealer Publishing Company, Cleveland, Ohio
- Key Corp National Bank, Cleveland, Ohio
- Ronald McDonald House, Cleveland, Ohio
- The Cleveland Zoological Society, Cleveland, Ohio
- Jones, Day, Reavis, & Pogue, Cleveland, Ohio
- Kent State University, Kent, Ohio
- The Jewish Community Center, Cleveland, Ohio
- Myers and Company, Cleveland, Ohio
- Steven Paternite, Akron, Ohio

== See also ==
- Classical Realism
- Contemporary Realism
- Portrait Painting
- Post-contemporary
- Women artists
