= Dalma Takács =

Hungarian-American novelist (1933–2016)

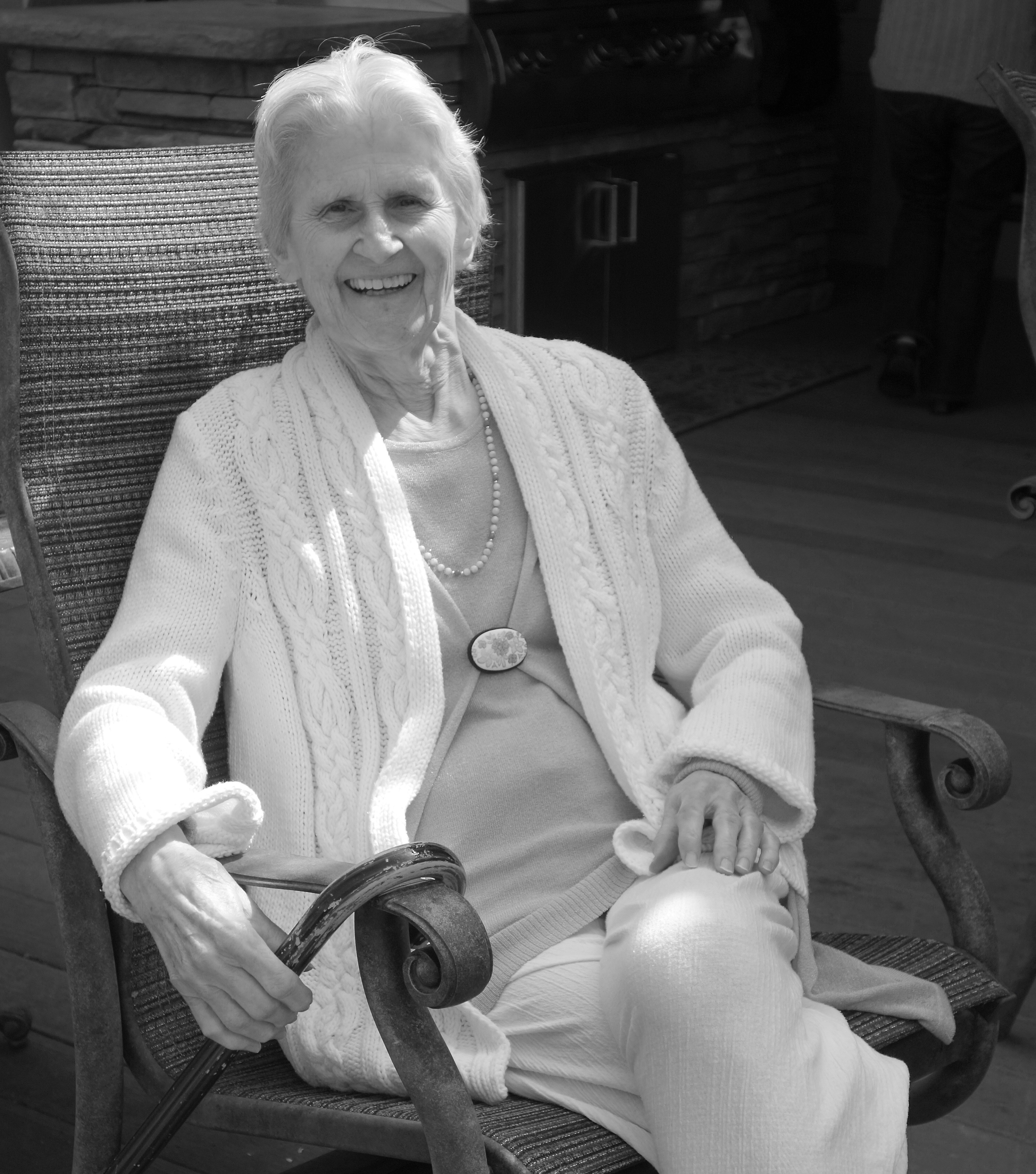
- Dalma Takács
- Born: 24 March 1933; Budapest, Hungary
- Died: 24 June 2016; Cleveland, Ohio, U.S.
- Education: Westfield College; University of London; Columbia University; Case Western Reserve University
- Spouse: Lajos Takács
- Writing career
- Notable works: Clear the Line, Our Story, Refugee from Paradise

Dalma Takács (24 March 1933 – 24 June 2016) was a Hungarian-American novelist of fictional and historical works.

== Author ==
=== Clear the Line ===
Takács was editor of the memoir, Clear the Line, the historical account of Hungary's struggle to leave the Axis during the Second World War. “In March 1942, Miklós Horthy replaced Prime Minister Lazlo Bardossy, […] with Miklós Kallay, who shared the regent’s goal of regaining the favor of the Western—non-Soviet—Allies. Kallay was able to communicate to the Allies that Hungary was open to switching sides again should they make it to Hungary’s border and offer Hungary protection from German and/or Soviet occupation.”

The story is told through the experiences of Takács’ mother, Laura-Louise Veress and her second husband, Hungarian diplomat, Lazslo Veress. Veress played a role in the Hungarian government's efforts to extricate Hungary from her alliance with Hitler. The title, “Clear the Line” refers to Winston Churchill's order to keep the lines of communication open in order to receive the Hungarian surrender to the British.

In Winston Churchill's six volume book series, The Second World War, he relates his own directions from the telegram he sent concerning Hungary's offer of surrender in September 1943.

“Most Immediate — Clear The Line

The position of the Magyars in Hungary has been maintained over many centuries and is regarded as an European entity. Its submergence in the Russian flood could not fail to be either the source of future conflicts or the scene of a national obliteration.”

Takács' Clear the Line has been placed in the Hoover Institution Archives and has been reviewed in the Times Literary Supplement by M. R. D. Foot. Takács has also written about the book for a feature in the Cleveland Plain Dealer.

=== Our Story: Saga of a Hungarian American Family ===
Takács researched and wrote the historical, Our Story: Saga of a Hungarian American Family which begins in 1586 and documents the details of the Takács, Horváth and Saxe Coburg families within the context of Hungarian History and later, their lives in the United States. In addition to biographical details about her mother and step-father who play major roles in Clear the Line, other notable members of the family discussed in Our Story are Dukai Takách Judit, Hungary's first woman poet and Pálóczi Horváth Lajos, Takács' father who spoke nine languages and translated books by Thomas Hardy, Thomas Wolf and Juan Valera into Hungarian. Her father also spent time in political prison for anti-communist views and was freed during the 1956 Hungarian Revolution. He tells the story of his life during wartime in the autobiographical, Két világ határán (translation: Between two worlds). Takács' aunt was Sarolta Halász, who became the last Princess of Sachen-Coburg of Gotha, when she married Phillipp August Sachsen-Coburg of Gotha.

There is a chapter dedicated to Dalma Takács' husband, mathematician, Lajos Takács, a Pioneer in Queueing Theory. There are also chapters dedicated to each of Takács' daughters; Susan Takács, who works at a law firm in Cleveland and contemporary realist artist, Judy Takács, whose paintings have been used on the book covers of Takács' novels

=== Fiction ===
A novelist, Takács' fictions include, The Condo, Or…Life a Sequel and the autobiographical historical fiction, Refugee from Paradise. She has also written works designed to educate the young in English Literature; Meet Me at the Globe is based on the life and works of William Shakespeare and her play, Encounter at the Tabard, is based on Geoffrey Chaucer's Canterbury Tales.

== Educator ==
Takács taught in the Cleveland Public Schools as a High School English Teacher and Librarian from 1973 until 1986, when she accepted a position as associate professor at Notre Dame College of Ohio. At Notre Dame, she was made full professor in 1997 and also chairperson of the English/Communications Department. In 1993, she was awarded the Distinguished Faculty Award. She retired from Notre Dame College of Ohio as Professor Emeritus in 2012, but continued to tutor students in English Literature until her death at the age of 83.

== Education ==
- Columbia University, New York, NY, 1969: PhD English and Comparative Literature
- Columbia University, New York, NY, 1962: MA in English and Comparative Literature
- Case Western Reserve University, Cleveland, Ohio, 1972: MA in Library Science
- University of Reading, England, Dept. of Education, 1956: Diploma in Education
- Westfield College, University of London, England, 1954: BA Honours in English

== Bibliography ==
- Encounter at the Tabard (1991)
- Clear the Line: Hungary's Struggle to Leave the Axis During the Second World War (1995)
- Meet Me at the Globe (2002)
- Our Story: Saga of a Hungarian-American Family (2007)
- The Condo, Or...Life, a Sequel (2010)
- Refugee from Paradise (2013)
