= Shirley Aley Campbell =

American painter (1925–2018)

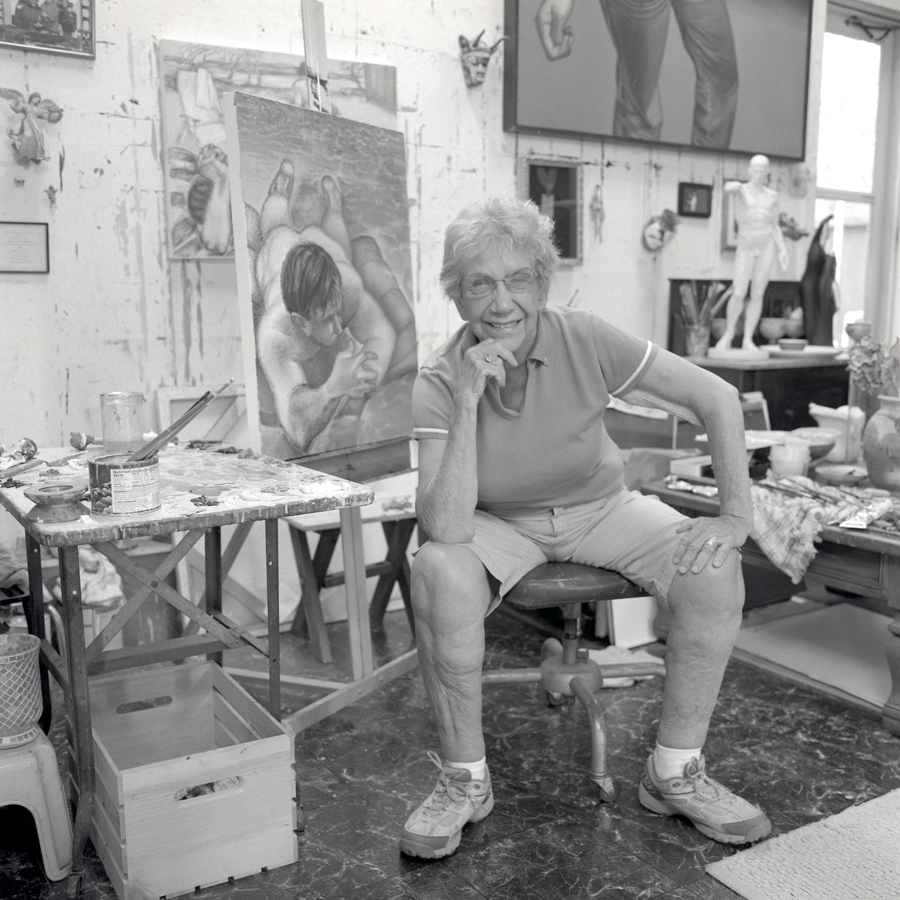
- Photo by: Herbert Ascherman Jr., Shirley Aley Campbell, 2009, Silver gelatin print, Permanent Collection of the Artists Archives of the Western Reserve
- Born: March 26, 1925; Cleveland, Ohio, U.S.
- Died: August 13, 2018 (aged 93); Cleveland, Ohio
- Education: Bachelor of Fine Arts
- Known for: Realism
- Movement: Contemporary Figurative Realism
- Awards: Cleveland Art Prize 1986

Shirley Aley Campbell (March 26, 1925 – August 13, 2018) was a figurative realist painter, called "Cleveland’s own artistic blend of Alice Neel and Lucien Freud".

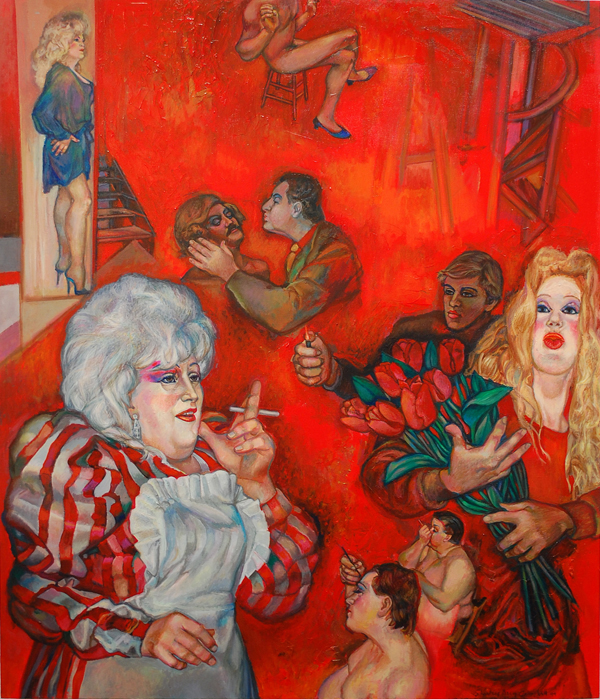
Two Red Tulips by Shirley Aley Campbell

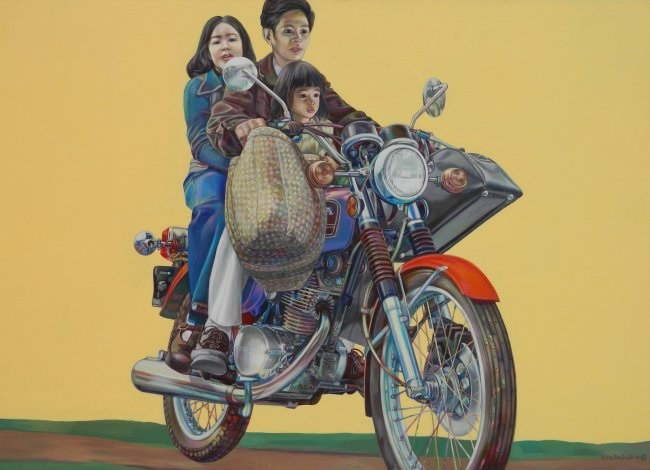
Vietnamese Family by Shirley Aley Campbell

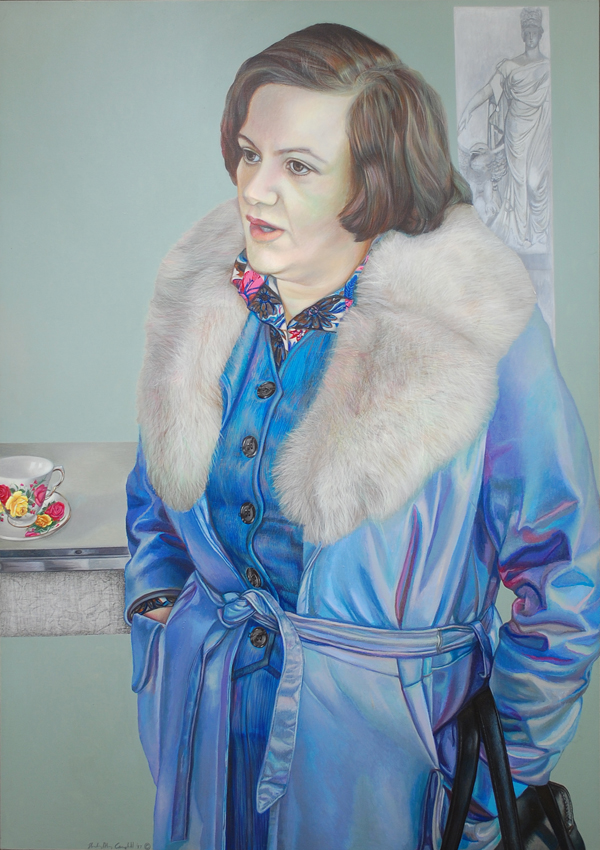
Portrait of Mary Rose Oakar by Shirley Aley Campbell

== Quotes ==
"Campbell’s art explores the vast range of the human condition. She paints strippers, celebrities, hookers, politicians, bullfighters, burlesque queens, alcoholics, and motorcyclists. Pursuing her subjects with the intensity of a reporter, she travels to observe people performing daily tasks in familiar surroundings, interviews them, and fills page after page with sketches. Despite the obvious opportunity for social or political commentary, she focuses on the common humanity of her subjects and presents each with individual compassion." —Mindy Tousley, Executive Director, The Artists Archives of the Western Reserve

"Shirley Aley Campbell has created a luminous career painting the invisible people. Or, as she says: the ugly ones, the ones who have had misery, but who don't give up on life. For decades, that has meant she's painted the people most Clevelanders overlook: prostitutes, drag queens, gays and lesbians, and transgender individuals in a time when acceptance wasn't as readily available as today." —Laura DeMarco, The Plain Dealer

== Life and career ==
Shirley Aley Campbell grew up in Cleveland and attended Collinwood High School. Her talent for drawing was recognized early, and she was encouraged to attend Saturday morning art classes at the Cleveland Museum of Art. Her teacher Milton J. Fox was highly influential at this early stage in her life. "Mr. Fox opened her mind, and her eyes and her ears to the whole world of the arts: he explained the bones and muscles of the body so that a young person could understand ... Mr. Fox was without doubt the person who set the course of Shirley Aley's life."

She attended Cleveland Institute of Art, where some of her instructors were artists of the "Cleveland School"—Paul Travis, Kenneth Bates, Frank Wilcox and William Eastman. These instructors guided her to "envision the parts that comprised the total human figure and the whole composition". Campbell distinguished herself at the Cleveland Institute of Art and graduated with the top honor awarded by the school, the Agnes Gund Memorial Scholarship. This enabled her to travel to Estes Park, Colorado, to study with designer Emmy Zweybruck. In 1949 she married Robert Campbell, a student of commercial art at the Cleveland Institute of Art, with whom she moved to New York, to study at the Pratt Institute of Art and the Art Student's League.

In 1954, Campbell made Cleveland, Ohio, her home and thus began her career as a figurative artist of Northeast Ohio. In 1957, she received the First Award for Painting in the Cleveland Museum of Art Annual May Show for Requiem for Dominic. This painting was purchased and is now in the permanent collection of the Cleveland Museum of Art.

Campbell's paintings and drawings include many works that can be called portraits. Campbell herself, however, prefers to call them "figure studies". This is because, in the words of her biographer, Elizabeth McClelland, "Portraiture is possibly one of the most misunderstood and abused forms of all the visual arts. ... A revealing and horrifying experience is looking at the commemorative portraits of former executives in the corporate headquarters of commercial establishments. Their stern and purposeful faces may be represented by hand tinted photographs, or still worse, by portraits painted from photographs. It is portraiture at its lowest ebb."

Campbell's "portraits" do the opposite: "in studying her subjects, [Campbell] intuits, and interprets more than just physical features. She processes the facets of the personalities." One of Campbell's notable portraits is entitled Five Figure Exercise, Opus One, now in the permanent collection of the Butler Institute of American Arts. It depicts a group of persons who had in some way influenced Campbell's life: industrial designer Leon Gordon Miller, director of the Butler Institute of American Art Joseph Green Butler, chairman of the Humanities Department of Cuyahoga Community College Lawrence Vincent, literary critic and lecturer Eugenia Thornton Silver, and enamelist John F. Puskas. Campbell also painted a portrait of Art Nouveau lecturer Berenice Kent which was featured in the Washington Post in 1972. "Campbell’s interests have extended to celebrities (actress Margaret Hamilton, chanteuse Hildegarde), politicians (congresswomen Bella Abzug of New York and Mary Rose Oakar of Cleveland), fellow artists (Phyllis Seltzer, David E. Davis, Judy Takács, and Mindy Tousley), pianist Eunice Podis, race car driver Janet Guthrie, Olympic athlete Stella Walsh. Campbell's portrait of Mary Rose Oakar is discussed in the Plain Dealer by critic Steven Litt: "What matters most is Campbell’s ability to evoke a sense of Oakar’s sturdy body pressing against the snug folds of her leather coat. In Campbell’s better portraits, you never doubt there’s warm, breathing flesh under the clothing her subjects wear."

Cleveland Plain Dealer art critic Helen Cullinan praised Campbell's “"intimate, honest and often searing depiction, not only of the human face and figure, but of the human condition". She also called her an "acutely socially aware painter". This is especially apparent in her Burlesque Series, which she worked on from 1965 to 1967. The models for these large-scale figure paintings were the strippers at Cleveland's old Roxy Theater. Talking with these women backstage, Campbell "learned the histories of their sad and often tragic lives and accepted their pretenses of having college degrees or reading Ecclesiastes. […] A biographical connection between artist and subject establishes a rapport that extends to and is expressed in the painting, so we can not only see the individual but also get a sense of the conditioning that has shaped her life." In 1966, the show, Backstage Burlesque, opened at the Dickson Yates Gallery in Georgetown, and a writer for the Washington Star complained that "all the noise when strippers from the Gayety Theater invaded Georgetown for the opening of Backstage Burlesque, tended to obstruct a quiet view of the paintings." When the exhibition was shown at the Artzt Gallery in New York the following year, Art News critics noted "poses that reveal without sentimentality all the ill, the fat, the sag that flesh is heir to" and paintings that were "well-composed and skillfully painted mementos of mortality".

The burlesque paintings, among others, were shown in Campbell's 1994 retrospective exhibition at Lakeland Community College, From the '60's Burlesque to the Biographical '90s—A Personal Vision. Professor Walter Swyrydenko, chairman of the Fine Arts Department and gallery director, wrote, "In Campbell's most recent biographical series, one senses her strength and clarity of purpose. The artist, in her personal quest, shares with us a glimpse of this rare quality—the human spirit undaunted".

In 1973, Campbell began work on the commission she is perhaps best known for—her Motorcycle Series. She was commissioned by motorcycle aficianado and Cleveland businessman Joseph M. Erdelac to paint motorcycles and their riders. Erdelac sent Campbell to "Florida, the east and west coasts, England, France, Finland, and Sweden attending biking events and studying […] bikers. She sketched and photographed the figures and the motorcycles to make sure all the details were correct." "The series depicts the many ways in which motorcycles are used and reveals the wide range of people who ride them. Subjects include The Flying Angel herself, Debbie Lawler; John Burke, an eminently successful businessman, and his two sons; Swedish racer Kent Anderson; Dot Robinson, one of the best known women riders, who has owned a motorcycle dealership and continues to log thousands of miles a year on her pink Harley; John Knoble and Bob “Laco” Lawrence of the Hells Angels Los Angeles motorcycle Club; Abram Drain, one of the few black motorcycle competition riders; and Lord Hesketh of England, a motorcycle devotee and producer of Hesketh Motorcycles. The subject matter is diverse and [...] even includes a painting representative of a Vietnamese family fleeing Saigon [on a single motorcycle]."

In 1978, Campbell was honored with a Distinguished Alumnae retrospective exhibition by the Cleveland Institute of Art. The Motorcycle Series was shown at this exhibition.

In 1984, Cleveland Magazine included Shirley Aley Campbell as one of their "Most Interesting People", and in 1986, she was awarded the coveted Cleveland Arts Prize. She is featured with other Arts Prize winners in the 1995 book Spirit of Cleveland: Visual Arts Recipients of the Cleveland Arts Prize, 1961–1995.

Her work has been exhibited in two solo shows at the Butler Institute of American Art, Cleveland Institute of Art, Canton Museum of Art, Cuyahoga Community College, College of Wooster, Baldwin-Wallace College and Karamu House.

An Invited Artist in 1972 and Purchase Award Winner in 1959, Campbell has been juried into the Butler Midyear Show at the Butler Institute of American Art each year she entered from 1954 to 1973. Campbell also won the highest award of First Place at the Annual Cleveland Museum of Art May Show for three consecutive years from 1957 to 1959. She was honored for this at the 1977 May Show Retrospective. Campbell has also won awards from The Women's City Club Foundation, Cleveland Institute of Art, and won First Place at the 1959 Chautauqua Exhibition.

Campbell's work is in the permanent collections of museums such as The Cleveland Museum of Art, Butler Institute of American Art, Evanston Museum of Art and the Canton Museum of Art.

In 1999 Shirley Aley Campbell's work was permanently archived in the collection of The Artists Archives of the Western Reserve. As part of the archival process, she was photographed by Herbert Ascherman Jr.

In 2004, at almost 80 years old, Campbell focused on nude figure drawings and was the subject of "By Ones and Twos: Portraits in a New Age, New Works by Shirley Aley Campbell" at the Dead Horse Gallery in Lakewood. Dan Tranberg of the Cleveland Plain Dealer, wrote that the "predominantly gray figure studies […] show her to be zooming in on the nude figure as a kind of assemblage of strange forms. [a work entitled Per Carnem III depicts] the bare back of a male sitter almost as if it were a landscape. The painting's undulating light and dark brush strokes treat the figure as an expanse of vague mounds."

In 2011, Campbell's work was the focus of a three-part retrospective exhibition by The Cleveland Artists Foundation (now ArtNEO) entitled "The Way of All Flesh", spread among three venues across Greater Cleveland—the Beck Center for the Arts in Lakewood, the Cuyahoga Community College Eastern Campus in Highland Hills, and Convivium33 Gallery.

In 2015, Campbell's work was curated by Judy Takács into the Artists Archives of the Western Reserve group exhibition "Majority Rising: Cleveland's Female Gaze", along with the work of Kathleen McKenna, Lee Heinen, Marsha Sweet, and Marilyn Szalay. This exhibition was also featured in the Collective Arts Network (CAN) Journal and in Cleveland Scene Magazine.

During her 70 years as a figurative artist in Cleveland, Shirley Aley Campbell was associate professor of drawing at both Cuyahoga Community College and the Cleveland Institute of Art. She retired as professor emeritus from Cuyahoga Community College in 1993 but still continued teaching small groups and privately. In 2014, Laura DeMarco of the Cleveland Plain Dealer wrote, "Today, Campbell paints another marginalized group in society: the elderly. Specifically, the residents of the Emerald Village Retirement Community, where the feisty artist lives." Campbell had an exhibition of these works in 2014, "The Beauty of Decadence" at the Maria Neil Art Project in Collinwood's Waterloo area.

Campbell died on August 13, 2018.

== Art ==
Two Red Tulips is characteristic of Campbell's paintings of the marginalized members of Society. It shows Transvestites and Burlesque Dancers.

Vietnamese Family is from Campbell's Motorcycle Series and depicts a family escaping from war-torn Vietnam on a single motorcycle.

Campbell's 1977 portrait of Congresswoman Mary Rose Oakar is part of the permanent collection of the ArtNEO Museum in Cleveland, Ohio.

== Selected exhibitions ==
- Fundamental Gestures, Figures from Life, curated by Christopher L Richards and Jamie M. Richey, ARTneo Museum, 2016
- Majority Rising, Cleveland’s Female Gaze, curated by Judy Takács, Artists Archives of the Western Reserve, Cleveland, Ohio, 2015
- The Beauty of Decadence, curated by John Farina and Adam Tully, Maria Neil Art Project, Cleveland, Ohio, 2014
- The Way of All Flesh, curated by Douglas Max Utter, Cleveland Artists Foundation sponsored three-venue exhibition at the Beck Center for Performing Arts, Cuyahoga Community College Eastern Campus and Convivum33 Gallery, Cleveland, Ohio 2011
- By Ones and Twos: Portraits in a New Age, New Works by Shirley Aley Campbell, Dead Horse Gallery, Lakewood, Ohio 2004
- From the 60s Burlesque to the Biographical 90s–A Personal Vision, curated by Walter Swyrydenko, Lakeland Community College, Kirtland, Ohio, 1994
- Seeing is Believing, Three-artist exhibition with Ed Raffel and Marilyn Szalay. Audrey Feinberg Art Gallery in Cain Park, Cleveland Hts., Ohio, 1995
- Shirley Aley Campbell: Motorcyclists of the Seventies, Butler Institute of American Art, Youngstown, Ohio, 1981
- A Retrospective of Works by Shirley Aley Campbell, Butler Institute of American Art, Youngstown, Ohio, 1977

== Awards ==
- Distinguished Alumnae Exhibition, 1978
- Cleveland Art Prize, 1986
- Outstanding Pace Setter Award, 1985
- Annual Midyear Juried Show, Purchase Prize 1950, Invited 1972, Juried in each year from 1954-1973, Butler Institute of American Art, Youngstown, Ohio
- May Show, First Place each year 1957-1959, Invited Artist 1977, Cleveland Museum of Art, Cleveland, Ohio
- Chautauqua Exhibition, First Place, Chautauqua Institution, New York, 1959

== Publications ==
- The Art of Shirley Campbell, Elizabeth McClelland, January 1995
- Spirit of Cleveland: Visual Arts Recipients of the Cleveland Arts Prize, 1961-1995, Cleveland Institute of Art
- The Archives Speak, November 2014, Rota Sackerlotzky and Roger Welchans, The Artists Archives of the Western Reserve, Cleveland, Ohio

== Selected permanent collections ==
- Cleveland Museum of Art, Cleveland, Ohio
- Butler Institute of American Art, Youngstown, Ohio
- ArtNEO Museum, Cleveland, Ohio
- Artists Archives of the Western Reserve, Cleveland, Ohio
- Evanston Museum of Art, Evanston, Illinois
- Kansas City Museum of Art, Kansas City, Missouri
- Mansfield Museum of Art, Mansfield, Ohio
- Massilon Museum of Art, Massilon, Ohio
- Akron Art Museum, Akron, Ohio
- UCLA Collection, Los Angeles, California
- Canton Museum of Art, Canton, Ohio
- Bella Abzug, New York
- Joseph Erdelac, Cleveland, Ohio
- Alcoa Aluminum Corp, Pittsburgh, Pennsylvania
- Avis Rent-A-Car, Inc., New York, New York
