= Andrea Kowch =

American painter

- Born: 1986 (age 39–40); Detroit, Michigan
- Education: College for Creative Studies
- Occupation: painter

Andrea Kowch (born 1986) is an American painter known for her magical realism paintings of the Midwest.

== Early life and education ==
Kowch was born in Detroit, Michigan, and enjoyed trips to the country while growing up. After winning two gold medals from the Scholastic Art and Writing Awards, she gained representation at the Corcoran Gallery of Art in 2003 and the Diane von Furstenberg Gallery in 2004. She attended the College for Creative Studies with a double major in illustration and arts education. In 2009, she graduated with a Bachelor of Fine Arts degree.

== Art ==
Kowch received representation from the Richard J. Demato Fine Arts Gallery in 2009, after Richard Demato saw her work in art book Spectrum 16: The Best in Contemporary Fantastic Art. In 2011, Southwest Art magazine listed Kowch as one of "21 under 31" rising stars in the art world. The next year, in 2012, SCOPE New York named her one of the top 100 emerging artists in the world. Kowch has had solo shows at Art Basel Miami, Grand Rapids Art Museum, the Muskegon Museum of Art, Los Angeles Art Show, ArtPrize, and more.

Her paintings feature women and animals in desolate American landscapes. She uses a small group of friends as models.
