= Rachel Constantine =

American painter (b. 1973)

- Born: 1973 (age 52–53); United States
- Education: Pennsylvania Academy of the Fine Arts
- Occupation: Visual artist
- Years active: 2000–present
- Works: Portraiture, landscape, still-life, figurative oil painting and drawing
- Website: rachelconstantine.com

Rachel Constantine (born 1973) is an American painter, based in Philadelphia. She is known for realist and classical works.

== Works ==
Her artwork has been exhibited in the Philadelphia Museum of Art, the Pennsylvania Academy of the Fine Arts Museum, the Philadelphia Sketch Club, and the Woodmere Art Museum in Chestnut Hill, PA. Her painting "Self Portrait with a Man" was purchased by The Pennsylvania Academy of the Fine Arts for their permanent collection.

In 2006, Constantine was invited to exhibit in Artworks Gallery at the Philadelphia Museum of Art as the local complement to the museum's exhibition: Wyeth: Memory and Magic. Her work can be found in The Vivian O. and Meyer P. Potamkin Collection in the Pennsylvania Academy of the Fine Arts, and is featured in the book Alla Prima: A Contemporary Guide to Traditional Direct Painting written by Al Gury, the chairman of the Pennsylvania Academy's painting department.

In her Monument (2006), Constantine explores themes that are at once personal and timeless. The composition alludes both to the symbolic nature morte of the Baroque era and to the still lifes of Chardin. Her own sensibility adds poetry as well as an edge of modern anxiety and sadness.

In her Swan Pond (2002), the amount of thinner, oil, and so forth added to the paint has a profound effect on the quality of the brush calligraphy and the details in a painting. Broad, scumbled masses provide the setting for paint that has varying degrees of oil added to it. The gazebo, water reflection, and swans achieve their clarity because they are rendered with brushstrokes that are more thickly loaded with paint and also because that paint has a small amount of oil added. This follows the "lean to fat" concept of layering. The "fatter" final, detail touches sit on top with clarity due to the added oil, which created a sharper edge over the less oily paint beneath.

=== Beyond the Surface ===
Constantine made her curatorial debut at the Principle Gallery in Alexandria, Virginia, with Beyond the Surface, a group show featuring work from realist artist who include conceptual elements in their work along with their high levels of technical mastery. Artists chosen by Constantine include Daniel Sprick, Mario Robinson, Charles Morris, Rose Frantzen, Stephen Layne, Amy Kann, Renee Foulks, Stephen Early, and Stephen Cefalo.
