= Judith Carducci =

American contemporary figurative painter

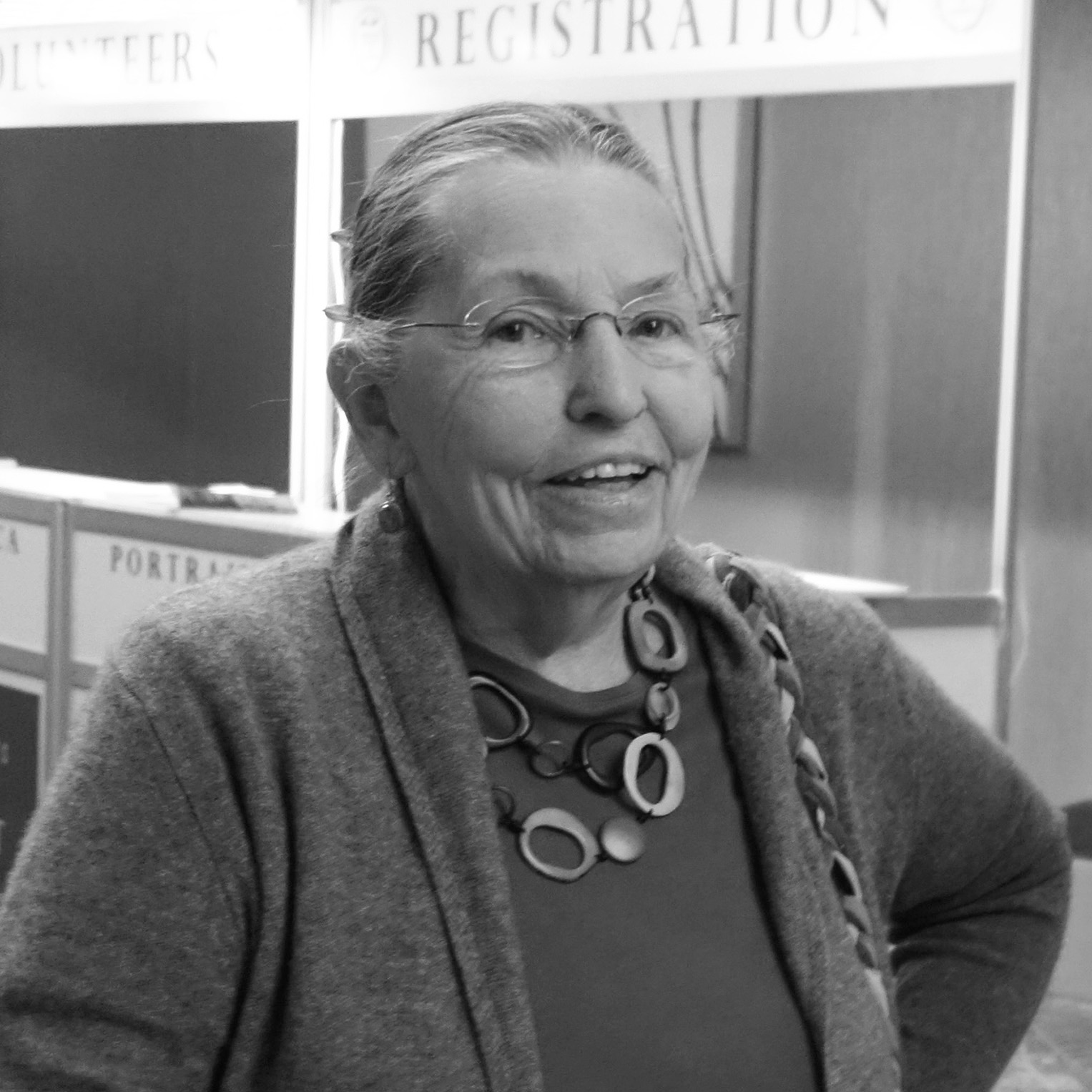
- Born: 1935; Norwood, Massachusetts
- Died: 2023 (aged 87–88)
- Known for: Realism
- Movement: Pastel Portrait Artist
- Spouse: Duilio Carducci
- Website: http://www.judithcarducci.com/

Judith Carducci (February 25, 1935 – August 3, 2023), was an American pastel portrait artist and instructor associated with figurative art, who worked and lived in Northeast Ohio. Her work is held in several public collections including Butler Institute of American Art and University of Maine Museum of Art.

Along with Everett Kinstler, Burton Silverman, Daniel Greene, and others, Carducci was a charter member of the Portrait Society of America. She served on the faculty and board of directors from 2000 until 2020, earning Signature Status the first year it was introduced as an honorable distinction in 2014.

An advocate for women artists at the Portrait Society of America, Carducci and Edward Jonas co-founded the Cecilia Beaux Forum Sub-Committee in 2005 to address the specific issues women portrait artists face in a male-dominated profession. Carducci chaired the Cecilia Beaux Forum from 2005 until 2020.

Dr. Louis Zona, director emeritus of the Butler Institute of American Art called soft pastels “…probably the most difficult media within the world of art” Carducci worked to advance the status of the soft-pastel medium as equal to oil painting.

In 2022, Carducci wrote and published her autobiography, Role Reversal, My Life In-Out-In Art. Louis Zona, executive director of the Butler Institute of American Art, said that Carducci's book “rival[s] in a special way the writings of Robert Henri”, author of “The Art Spirit.”

== Life and career ==
Carducci was born Judith Weeks Barker in Norwood, Massachusetts on February 25, 1935.

Carducci worked for almost 30-years as a social worker at Veterans Administration clinics in New Jersey and Cleveland, Ohio. She was also an instructor at Case Western Reserve University, co-authoring “The Caring Classroom: For Teachers Troubled by Difficult Student and Classroom Disruption” with her husband, Dewey Carducci.

When she fully retired from her career as a social worker in 1988, and her husband died from a long illness in 2004 Carducci began her career as a professional artist. She studied figure drawing with George Danhires, at University of Akron from 1995 to 1998 and took private lessons with Daniel Greene, in 1995 and 1996. She also studied under Albert Handel, Don Getz, Burton Silverman, and Martin Campos.

Carducci was a finalist in the Washington DC Society of Portrait Artists national exhibition for her portrait of “Max with his Grandfather’s Tallis”. She was recognized in Who's Who in American Art, and was featured in American Artist Magazine, The Artists Magazine, The Pastel Journal, Pastelagram: Journal of the Pastel Society of America, International Artist, and The Art of the Portrait, (the Members Journal of the Portrait Society of America). M. Stephen Doherty, Former Editor in Chief of the American Artist and Plein Air Magazines called her “an acknowledged master of pastel, Judith Carducci is immediate and personal in all aspects of her art and life.”

In 1999 Carducci was awarded Best of Show at the first Portrait Society of America International Conference and Competition in Washington DC for her pastel portrait of an inner-city high school student and his mother, “Mother and Son”. In 2003, Gordon Wetmore, then president of the Portrait Society of America said that Carducci “has become one of the most outstanding artists in the country with her superb draftsmanship and use of color.” “Mother and Son” is now in the permanent collection of the University of Maine Museum of Art, (Bangor, Maine).

In 2005 Carducci entered her pastel portrait, “The Widow” in the first Outwin Boochever Portrait Competition at the National Portrait Gallery in Washington, DC. At the time it was a “paintings only” competitive exhibition. The director called her personally to let her know why her work would not be accepted; it was not a “painting.” Carducci, “the Ruth Bader Ginsburg of the Portrait Artist World…tiny but mighty and never shy about expressing a dissenting opinion,” argued that a pastel is a painting. She cited the Pastel Society of America mission statement and purpose to assert that pastel paintings such as “The Widow” begin with wet media and utilize the full range of colors as oil and watercolor paintings do. Despite her arguments, her portrait was ultimately not accepted. The Outwin Boochever Portrait Competition now accepts a wide variety of media, including photography, sculpture, installations and videos.

“The Widow” is included in the permanent collection of the Butler Institute of American Art. In 2024 it was exhibited at the Butler as part of “The Figure-The Face: Pastels from the Butler’s Collection” along with portraits from the permanent collection by Everett Raymond Kinstler, Flora B. Giffuni, Harvey Dinnerstein and Isabel Bishop.

In 2008, Judith Carducci played a courtroom sketch artist in a commercial featuring LeBron James for Vitamin Water. The sketches that resulted from this effort now hang in James’ private collection.

In September 2011, Carducci, along with Butler Institute of American Art Executive Director Louis Zona and sculptor Rhoda Sherbell, curated “Inspiring Figures” in conjunction with the Cecilia Beaux Forum of the Portrait Society of America, at the Butler Institute of American Art. The goal was to feature women figurative artists. Work from contemporary portrait artists Mary Whyte, Ellen Eagle and Sharon Sprung were hung alongside work by historic American artists Cecilia Beaux, Mary Cassatt and Alice Ruggles Sohier from the Butler Institute Collection.

Judith Carducci had a solo exhibition; “As She Sees It” at Hillsdale College and two at the Moos Gallery of Western Reserve Academy in Hudson, Ohio.

In May 2015 the Butler Institute of American Art hosted Carducci's solo exhibition at the Flora B. Giffuni Pastel Gallery. Marlene Steele, Ohio Ambassador for the Portrait Society of America reviewed the exhibit:

“Carducci’s prize-winning work is recognized for her good grounding in solid draughtsmanship and spot-on sense of color, both attributes a product of years of drawing from life. Carducci also presents her personal perspectives on whatever she makes, whether it is still life, landscape, figure and portrait, and relishes the act of doing so.”

Carducci's solo show included a portrait of, Louis Zona then Director of the Butler Institute of American Art, who posed for the portrait which she painted from life as a public demonstration. Zona stated that he hopes the portrait will end up in the Smithsonian National Portrait Gallery

In 2022, Judith Carducci wrote her autobiography, Role Reversal: My Life In-Out-In Art.

In 2023, she wrote, Steel Table Still Lives: Reflections. The book is a collection of the still life paintings she created while isolating during the pandemic. Carducci also “shared practical advice regarding the nuts and bolts of working in pastel, setting up a studio, care of materials, procedures and how to navigate working in different locations.”

Shortly before her death, Judith Carducci posed for a live portrait demonstration by portrait artists, Rose Frantzen and Jeffrey Hein at the Portrait Society of America conference in Washington DC, May 2023. At the posing session, Carducci recited her favorite Rudyard Kipling poem from memory, “When Earth’s Last Picture is Painted: L’Envoi”. ” This poem was inspiration for her Vanitas III-Self Portrait at 80 altarpiece that was shown at her solo show at the Butler Institute of American Art.

Judith Carducci died three months later at the age of 88, peacefully in her sleep.

== Art ==
L'Envoi, Vanitas III Self-portrait at 80, Judith Carducci, Inspired by Rudyard Kippling's poem, “When Earth’s Last Picture is Painted: L’Envoi.” Showed at Butler Institute of American Art as part of Judith Carducci's solo show in 2015.

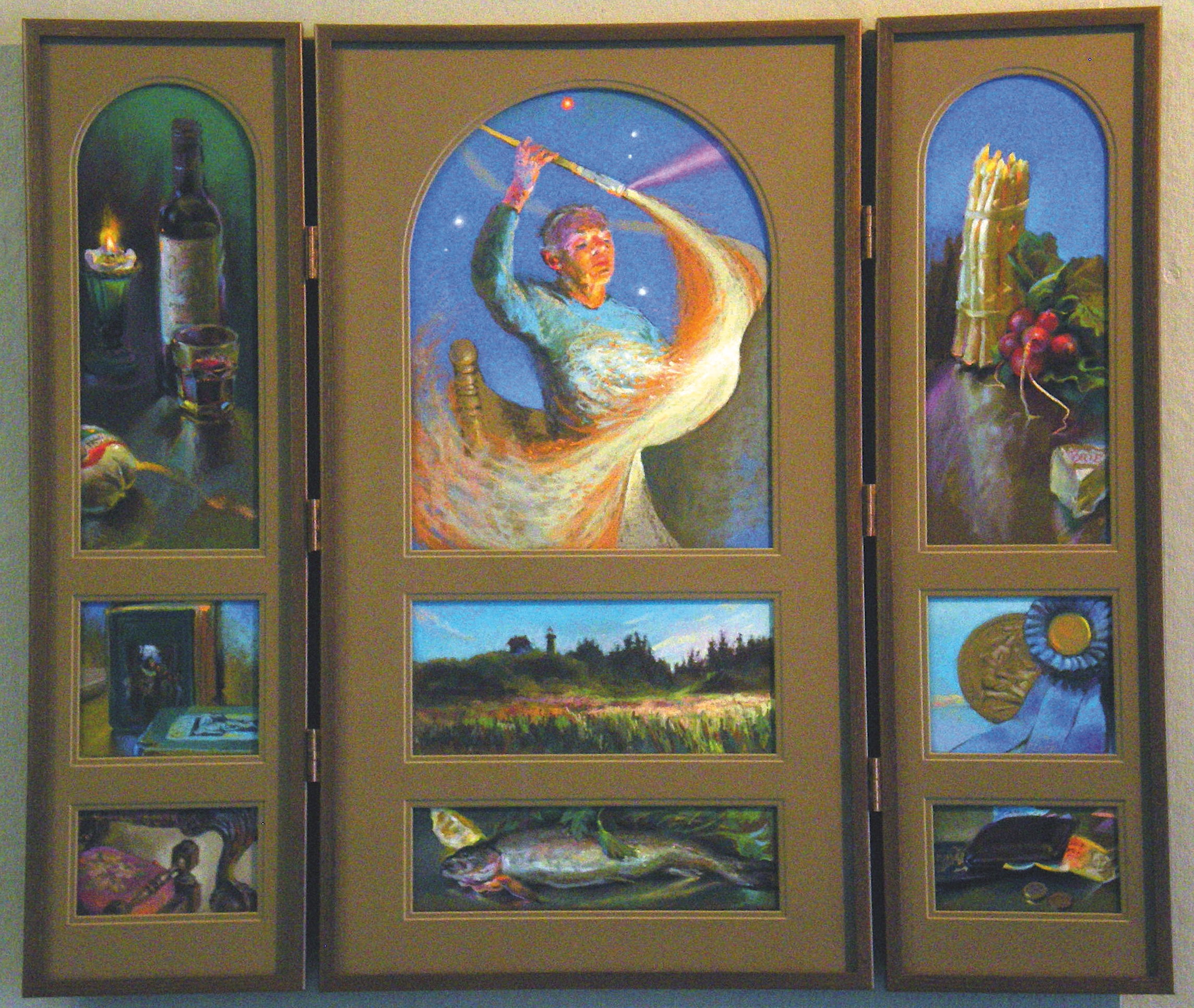
L'Envoi Vanitas III, Self Portrait at 80Judith Carducci

Mother and Son, Judith Carducci. Best in Show at the Portrait Society of America International Competition, 1999, Washington DC

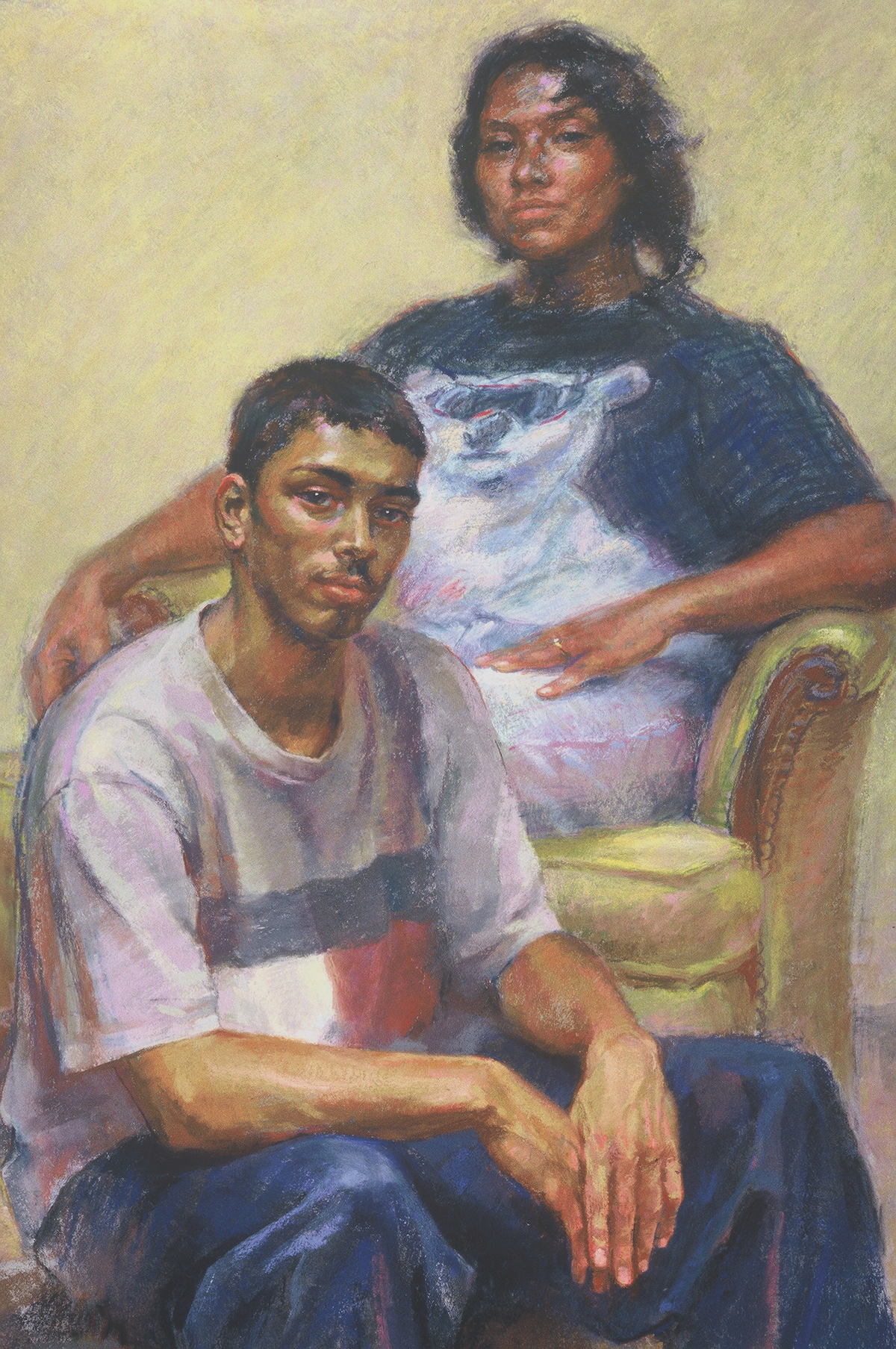
Mother and Son, Judith Carducci

The Widow, 2004, Judith Carducci. Butler Institute of American Art, Permanent Collection.

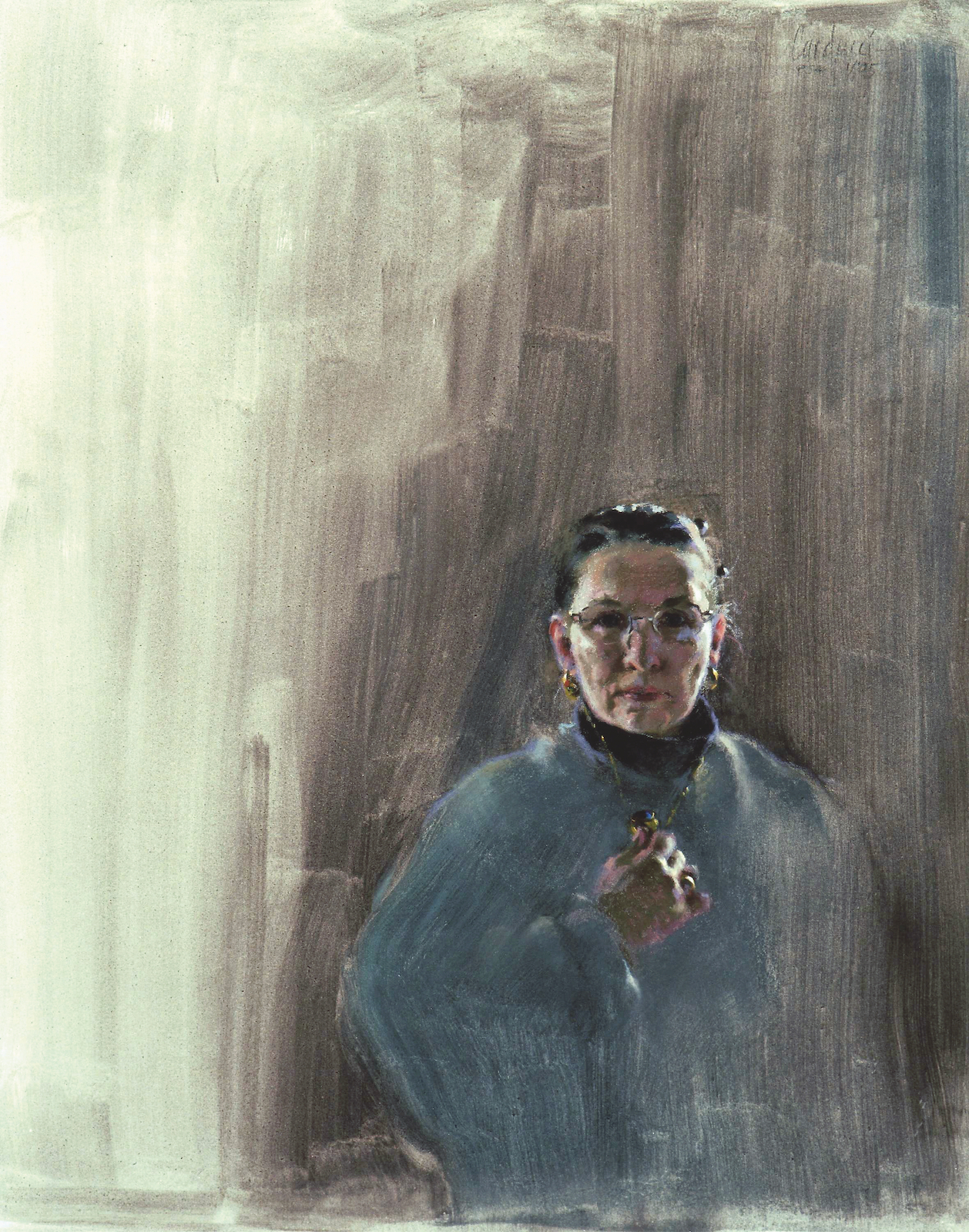
The Widow, Judith Carducci

Dr. Louis Zona, executive director of the Butler Institute of American Art. Private Collection.

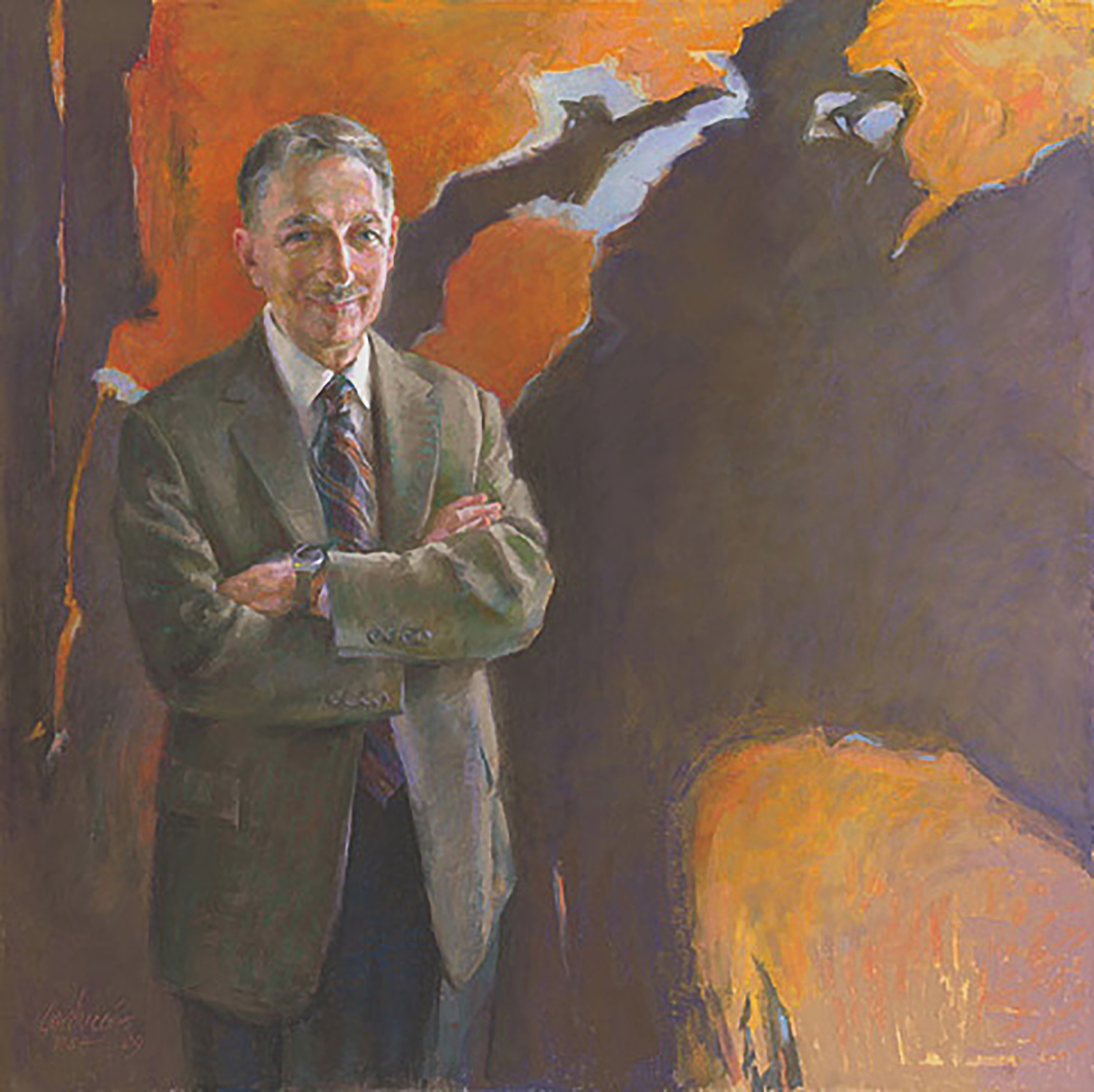
Portrait of Dr. Louis Zona and the Motherwell, Judith Carducci

Duilio Carducci at Home, Judith Carducci. Collection of the Artist's Family.

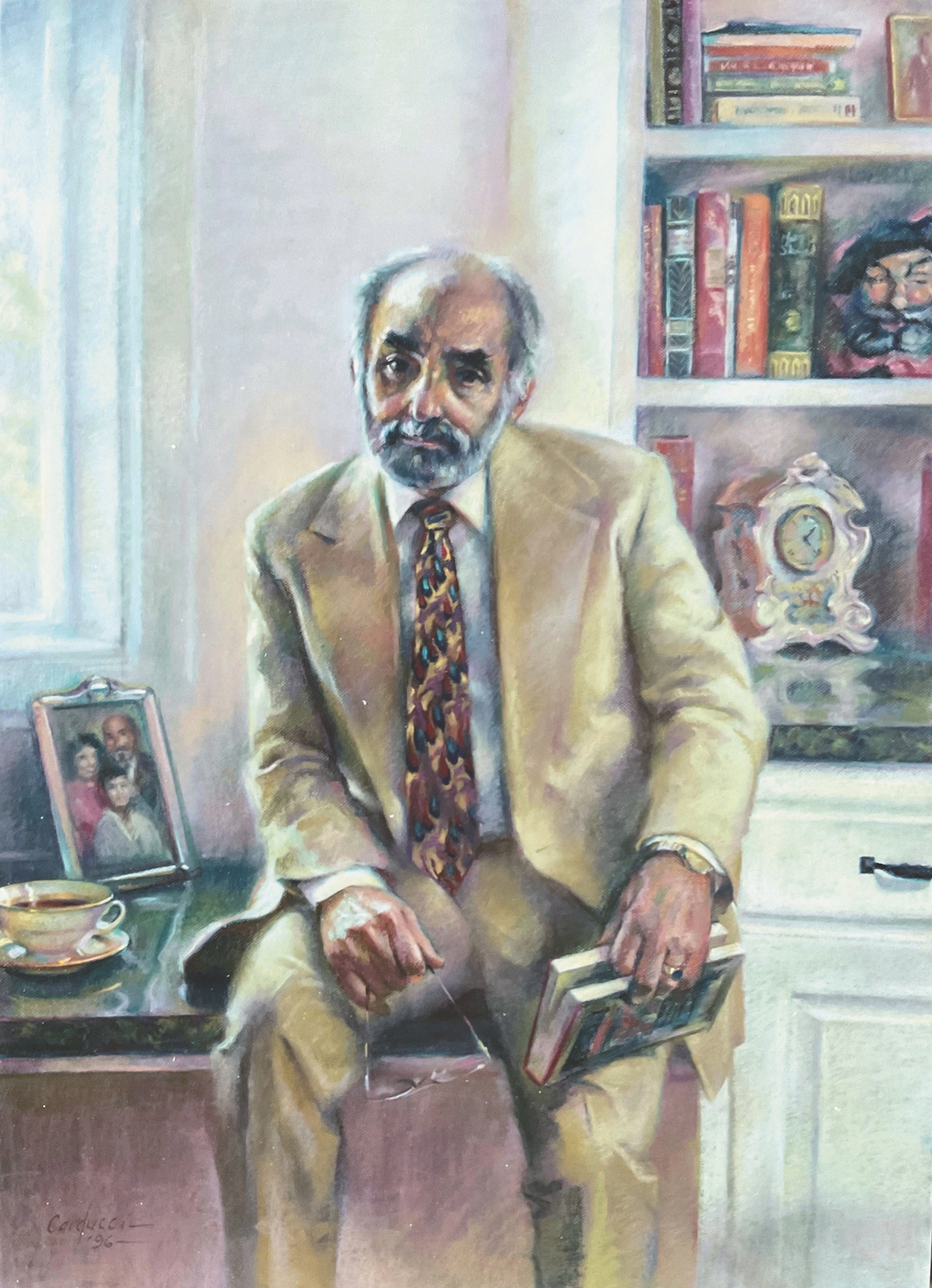
Portrait of Duilio Carducci at Home, Judith Carducci

== Professional honors ==
- Signature Member, Pastel Society of America
- Signature and Founding Member, Faculty, Board, Portrait Society of America
- Emeritus Member, Salmagundi Club
- Emeritus Member, Signature Member, Board Member, Akron Society of Artists
- Juried Member, Cincinnati Art Club, Degas Pastel Society

== Awards ==
- Best in Show for Mother and Son, Portrait Society of America International Competition, 1999, Washington, DC
- Popular Choice, Portrait Society of America Face-Off Competition, National Conference, 2009
- Best in Show, Akron Society of Artists
- Finalist, Max with his Grandfather's Tallis. Washington DC Society of Portrait Artists National Exhibition. Juried by William Franklin Draper

== Bibliography ==
North Light Books, Strokes of Genius 4: The Best of Drawing, 2012, My Name is Blue, Judith Carducci included.

The Caring Classroom: For Teachers Troubled by Difficult Student and Classroom Disruption co-authored with Dewey Carducci.

Role Reversal: My Life In-Out-In Art, 2022, Little Red Hen

Steel Table Still Lives: Reflections, 2023, Little Red Hen
