= Felice House =

American painter

- Born: North Carolina, U.S.
- Education: Schuler School of Fine Arts, The University of Texas
- Known for: Painting, Photography
- Website: felicehouse.com

Felice House is an American figurative painter and Professor of Art at Texas A&M University. She is most known for her oil-painting portraits of famous Western characters re-imagined as women.

== Early life and education ==
House grew up in Massachusetts in a family of artists. Her grandmother is a weaver, her father worked in computer graphics, and her mother is a painter.

House attended an international Baháʼí Faith boarding high school in Canada. Her classmates represented 57 different countries and race and gender equality were central discussions in the curriculum. House has noted that her early academic experience there has influenced her art.

House studied painting at the Schuler School of Fine Arts in Baltimore, Maryland and earned her Master of Fine Arts degree in painting from the University of Texas in 2011.

She is an artist, as well as an assistant professor of art at Texas A&M University.

== Works ==
House is most known for her portrait series, Re/Western and Face West, which both take classic cowboy characters played by actors like James Dean, John Wayne, Clint Eastwood, Alan Ladd, and Gary Cooper, and re-imagine them as women. House has said that she is drawn to the Western film genre, but is frustrated by the gender norms played out in traditional Western narratives. By painting well-known leading characters as women, House challenges the male-dominated nature of the Western film industry. She also hopes to juxtapose male cowboy archetypes against the roles offered to women in those films, which tend to be passive characters or sexist tropes.

House has exhibited paintings in galleries and museums across the United States and Canada including Maryland, Georgia, Colorado, Louisiana, Tennessee, New Mexico, Texas, and Nova Scotia. She has also shown her work in the U.K.

== Style ==
House paints her portraits on canvases that are slightly larger than life so that viewers must look up to see the whole subject.

For her cowgirl portraits, she asks family members, friends, colleagues, and strangers in her community to pose for her. She often paints subjects to be non-confrontational, with gazes off in the distance.
