= Mario Robinson =

American painter

Mario Andres Robinson (born 1970) is an American painter, pastellist, and draftsman.

Robinson was born in Altus, Oklahoma. At the age of 12 he moved with family to New Jersey. He was encouraged to develop his innate talent for the expression of visual art by a fifth grade teacher, and so began building what would soon become a prodigious body of work.

Robinson studied at the Pratt Institute in New York City.From the beginning of his career, Robinson was influenced by the work of Degas, Rembrandt, Vermeer among others. He studied their techniques and elementally broke down their works. He later deconstructed the work of various contemporary American artists.

Robinson's art was described on the Art Renewal Center's website as:

The work of Mario Andres Robinson fits squarely within the tradition of American painting. Robinson's finished works bear a close affinity to the masters of the realist tradition, Andrew Wyeth and Thomas Eakins. Containing few references to modern life, Robinson's work has a timeless and universal quality, and exhibits a distinct turn-of-the-century stylistic aesthetic. The images he chooses, which refer to a bygone era where solitude and reflection were abundant, also provoke frequent allusions to the paintings of Winslow Homer and Edward Hopper.

Beginning in 1994, Robinson's work began to extensively incorporate rural subjects primarily located in the state of Alabama. Each subject is very personal for Robinson in both selection and execution. As the work progresses, the artist's relationship with the sitter develops and a uniquely personal story begins to evolve. Robinson frequently depicts his subjects framed within the context of their daily lives. The underlying narrative counters sentimentality and serves as the underpinning for his figurative images.

While a confluence of styles has exerted varying degrees of influence over Robinson, the artist's individuality continually asserts itself. He is capable of exceptional technical proficiency, which he uses to convey his vision of people and places in his immediate world, and the rural venues he chooses to depict.

In 2016, Robinson was one of the nine artists, including, Stephanie Deshpande, Judy Takács, Laur Tilden and Terry Strickland, who participated in the Emanuel Nine Portrait Project at Principle Gallery, honoring the victims of the Charleston Church shooting. He painted the portrait of Cynthia Hurd, one of the nine victims.
