= Linda Tracey Brandon =

American representational painter (born 1955)

- Born: 1955 (age 70–71)
- Education: Parsons New School for Design; Scottsdale Artists' School; University of Michigan; New York University School of Law
- Known for: Painting
- Movement: Still life; landscape
- Website: lindatraceybrandon.com

Linda Tracey Brandon is an American representational painter who paints portraits and the human figure in addition to creating works in other genres, such as still life and landscape.

== Early life and education ==
Brandon was born in Michigan in 1955 and is a graduate of the University of Michigan and New York University School of Law. According to a gallery profile on 1stdibs, Brandon received an award for her animated films during her undergraduate studies.

== Career ==
Brandon worked as a radio news reporter for WUOM-FM in Ann Arbor, Michigan, and as a television reporter and anchorwoman for WILX-TV in Jackson, Michigan. She worked as a lawyer in New York City before relocating to Arizona. Brandon later worked as a representational painter using oils and graphic media.

== Publications ==
She is the author of the children's book The Little Flower Girl.

== Art training ==
She studied under several representational/realist drawing and painting teachers through the years. In New York, she took an illustration course at the Parsons New School for Design. After a move to Arizona, she took classes at the Scottsdale Artists' School, where she periodically teaches painting and drawing.

== Selected awards and recognition ==
Year	Award / Recognition	Source
2005	Exceptional Merit Award, Portrait Society of America International Competition	
2006	Certificate of Excellence, Portrait Society of America International Competition	
2007	"Jury’s Top 50", Salon International, International Museum of Contemporary Masters, Greenhouse Gallery	
2009–2011	Mentor, Portrait Society of America – Cecelia Beaux Society Artist Mentorship Program	
2010	Finalist Winner, The Artist’s Magazine Annual Art Competition (Landscape Category)	
2014	First Prize, Butler Institute of American Art's 87th Annual Midyear Exhibition	
2015	"Artist to Watch," Southwest Art Magazine	
2016	Semifinalist, Outwin Boochever Portrait Competition, National Portrait Gallery	

== Selected exhibitions ==
Year	Exhibition(s)	Location	Source
2017	University of Oklahoma, National Weather Center Biennale, Norman, OK	University of Oklahoma, Norman, OK	
2016	"Animalia" Group Juried Show, Abend Gallery, Denver, CO	Abend Gallery, Denver, CO	
2002–2010	“Faces” Juried Exhibition — Richeson 75: Figure & Portrait — Richeson 75: Still Life & Floral — Annual Holiday Miniature Show — Solo exhibitions (University Club of Phoenix; Cathedral Center for the Arts) — Featured Artist, Quintessence Gallery	Various locations in Arizona and Wisconsin	
