= Portrait Society of America =

Art organization in United States

- Founder: Gordon Wetmore, Edward Jonas, Tom Donahue
- Founded at: Magnolia Drive, Tallahassee, United States
- Headquarters: 1109 S Magnolia Dr, Tallahassee, FL 32301, United States
- Services: Art Programs, Publications
- Fields: Portraiture and Figurative art
- Secretary General: Sam Adoquei
- President: Michael Shane Neal

Portrait Society of America is an art organization based in Tallahassee, Florida, United States. Established in 1998, the Portrait Society of America is a 501(C)3 registered charity was set to serve the purpose of an art education organization to foster the art of like portraiture, figurative art and Contemporary-Traditional Art through art programs and publications. The Portrait Society provides educational resources including technical information, aesthetics in traditional art and history of portraiture and figurative art. The Portrait Society has more than 2,750 members around the globe.

The Portrait Society was established by Edward Jonas, Gordon Wetmore, and Tom Donahue as a national non-profit organization in 1998.

In 2005, Judith Carducci and Edward Jonas, co-founded the Cecilia Beaux Forum, a sub-committee of the Portrait Society of America to address the specific issues women portrait artists face in a male-dominated profession. At the forefront of the CBF mission was the mentorship program designed to give women who have begun a career as a portrait artist late or with interruptions, a mentor and resource for networking, growth and instruction. Carducci Chaired the Cecilia Beaux Forum from 2005 until 2020.

== Competitions ==
The Portrait Society of America hosts three competitions annually with The International Portrait Competition being the most prominent one. After many rounds of selection, twenty finalists are selected to exhibit their original work at The Art of the Portrait conference for a final round of judging and the selection of the awards. The William F Draper Award is the top award given by the organization.
