= Julian Keilson =

American mathematician

Julian Keilson (November 19, 1924 – March 8, 1999 in Rochester, New York) was an American mathematician. He was known for his work in probability theory. His work in survival analysis is relevant to many fields, e.g., medical research, parts supply, asset depreciation, rental pricing, etc.

He got his B.Sc. in physics from Brooklyn College, and M.Sc. and Ph.D. from Harvard University. His Ph.D. thesis advisor was the Nobel Prize–winning professor of Physics, Julian Schwinger. Next he worked at MIT Lincoln Laboratories and GTE Laboratories before joining the faculty at University of Rochester (1966–96) where he started the Applied Statistics department in the business school. He also taught at MIT Sloan School of Management (1986–92).

== Books ==
- Green's functions in probability theory (1965)
- Markov chain models -- rarity and exponentiality
