= Dimitris Anastassiou =

Greek academic

- Born: 1952 (age 73–74); Athens, Greece
- Education: National Technical University of Athens; University of California, Berkeley
- Known for: MPEG-2 technology
- Awards: IEEE Fellow (1998); IEEE Arun N. Netravali Video Analytics, Technology, and Systems Award (2026)
- Scientific career
- Fields: Electrical Engineering, Biomedical Engineering, Systems Biology
- Workplaces: Columbia University

Dimitris Anastassiou is an electrical engineer and Charles Batchelor Professor of Electrical Engineering in the Columbia University School of Engineering. Anastassiou's earlier work focuses primarily on signal and information processing and reverse engineering. His more recent work involves interdisciplinary research, specifically in systems biology, with investigators at Columbia University Medical Center. Anastassiou is Fellow of the IEEE for contributions to video technology, developing high-performance digital image and video coding techniques . He is also a Fellow of the National Academy of Inventors and recipient of both the National Science Foundation Presidential Young Investigator Award and the IBM Outstanding Innovation Award.

Anastassiou has made significant advances in the areas of digital technology. His research resulted in Columbia being the only university to hold patent in MPEG-2 technology, a crucial technique used in all types of digital televisions, DVDs, satellite TV, HDTV, digital cable systems, computer video, and other interactive media.

In 2013, a team led by Anastassiou won the DREAM Breast Cancer Prognosis Challenge with a genetic model that could predict cancer prognoses with 76% accuracy.

== Early life and education ==
Anastassiou was born in Athens, Greece in 1952. He received his Bachelor of Engineering from the National Technical University of Athens. Upon moving to the United States, Anastassiou earned M.S. and Ph.D. degrees from the University of California, Berkeley.

== Career ==
=== Electrical engineering (1979–1990s) ===
Dimitris Anastassiou is widely recognized in the engineering community. He is an IEEE Fellow, the recipient of IBM Outstanding Innovation Award, and a National Science Foundation Presidential Young Investigator. Anastassiou is also the recipient of the Columbia University Great Teacher Award.

Between 1979 and 1983, Dimitris Anastassiou was a Research Staff member at the IBM Thomas J. Watson Research Center in Yorktown Heights, NY. While at IBM, Anastassiou worked on the development of IBM videoconference software. In 1983, Anastassiou joined the faculty of Columbia University.

Anastassiou was the former director of Columbia University's Image and Advanced Television Laboratory and director of Columbia University's Genomic Information Systems Laboratory. He came to national prominence when he, with his student Fermi Wang developed the MPEG-2 algorithm for transmitting high quality audio and video over limited bandwidth in the early 1990s. As a result of his MPEG patent, Columbia University became the only university in the MPEG LA patent pool. Revenue from the patent pool allowed Anastassiou to pursue interdisciplinary research in other areas.

=== Transition to systems biology and later career (2000s) ===
In the early 2000s, Anastassiou moved away from his previous work in DVDs and compression and into Systems Biology. Anastassiou refers to his publications in engineering and signal processing as those from a "previous lifetime". Anastassiou is currently a faculty member of the Center for the Multiscale Analysis of Genomic and Cellular Networks.

In 2009, Anastassiou won an $800,000 award from the National Institute of Health jointly with Maria Karayiorgou of Columbia University Medical Center for a project entitled "Computational discovery of synergistic mechanisms responsible for psychiatric disorders", aiming to discover the biological mechanisms of psychological disorders such as schizophrenia. The project aims to investigate genetic variations based on genome-wide association data for psychiatric disorders to elucidate genetic mechanisms behind schizophrenia and bipolar disorder.

In 2013, Anastassiou was inducted as a Fellow of the National Academy of Inventors. As of 2013, Dimitris Anastassiou holds 14 U.S. and 8 international patents, which have so far generated up to $100 million in revenues for Columbia University.

In 2026, Anastassiou received the IEEE Arun N. Netravali Video Analytics, Technology, and Systems Award, together with Fermi Wang (a former student and the co-founder and CEO of Ambarella), "for pioneering contributions to the development and implementation of digital video compression and processing technologies".

==== Breast Cancer Prognosis Challenge ====
In 2013, a team led by Anastassiou won the Breast Cancer Prognosis Challenge (BCC), run by Sage Bionetworks and Dialogue for Reverse Engineering Assessments and Methods (DREAM), which challenged teams to develop models to predict breast cancer survival rates based on a large gene expression and clinical feature dataset. Anastassiou's team won the challenge despite being smaller and despite competing against teams from companies such as IBM, by taking an approach that was "out-of-the-box" and "completely novel".

His group's submission used a model which relied on the signatures of three metagenes, which Anastassiou's group had previously associated with several cancers. Prior to the challenge, Anastassiou had been doing research on attractor metagenes, genetic signatures expressed nearly identically between different cancers. The model predicts with 76 percent accuracy which of two breast cancer patients will live longer, which is far better than any models previously available.

Of the results, Anastassiou said:

These signatures manifest themselves in specific genes that are turned on together in the tissues of some patients in many different cancer types... If these general cancer signatures are useful in breast cancer, as we proved in this challenge, then why not in other types of cancer as well? I think that the most significant -- and exciting -- implication of our work is the hope that these signatures can be used for improved diagnostic, prognostic, and eventually, therapeutic products, applicable to multiple cancers.

The findings from the competition were published in Science Translational Medicine. While the results are not yet ready for clinical use, Anastassiou's group is currently working to extend these findings to predict whether patients need further treatment.

The research for the competition was partially funded by Anastassiou's patents in DVD encoding.

== See also ==
- Digital Technology
