= Eric Schadt =

American scientist

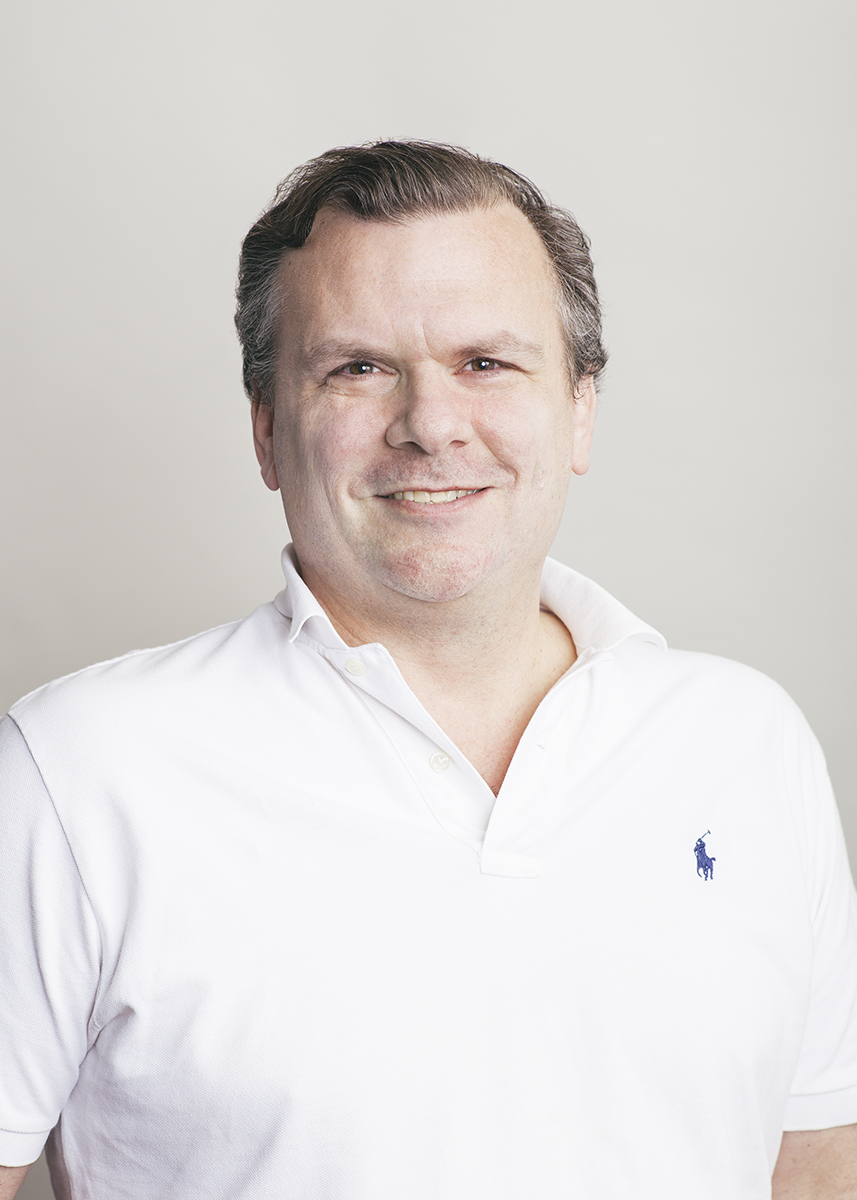
- Born: January 31, 1965 (age 61); St. Joseph, Michigan, United States
- Education: California Polytechnic State University; University of California, Davis; University of California, Los Angeles
- Scientific career
- Workplaces: Sema4; Icahn School of Medicine at Mount Sinai; Sage Bionetworks

Eric Emil Schadt (born January 31, 1965) is an American mathematician and computational biologist. He is founder and former chief executive officer of Sema4, a patient-centered health intelligence company, and dean for precision medicine and Mount Sinai Professor in Predictive Health and Computational Biology at the Icahn School of Medicine at Mount Sinai. He was previously founding director of the Icahn Institute for Genomics and Multiscale Biology and chair of the Department of Genetics and Genomics Sciences at the Icahn School of Medicine at Mount Sinai.

Schadt's work combines supercomputing and advanced computational modeling with diverse biological data to understand the relationship between genes, gene products, other molecular features such as cells, organs, organisms, and communities and their impact on complex human traits such as disease. He is known for calling for a shift in molecular biology toward a network-oriented view of living systems to complement the reductionist, single-gene approaches that currently dominate biology to more accurately model the complexity of biological systems. Schadt has also worked to engage the public, encouraging people to participate in scientific research and helping them understand privacy concerns around DNA-based information.

== Research and training ==
In 1983, Schadt left high school early to enlist in the United States Air Force and joined a Special Operations/Rescue unit. After sustaining a serious shoulder injury that required reconstructive surgery, Schadt attended California Polytechnic State University on a military scholarship to study computer science and mathematics, and received his bachelor's degree in applied mathematics in 1991. He went on to earn a master's degree in pure mathematics at the University of California, Davis in 1993. After that, he pursued a PhD in biomathematics at the University of California, Los Angeles, which required PhD candidacy in both molecular biology and biomathematics, completing his doctorate under the supervision of Ken Lange in 2000. During his PhD work, Schadt worked as a senior software engineer at the UCLA Office of Academic Computing and later as director of computing in the UCLA mathematical sciences department.

== Scientific career ==
=== Early career ===
While completing his PhD, Schadt joined Roche Bioscience in 1998 as a senior research scientist and began his work on DNA microarrays, designing novel algorithms to process and interpret these data. He published some of the first independently developed algorithms to process gene chip data work that he later applied to produce an early whole genome functional annotation of the human genome.

In 1999, after becoming acquainted with Stephen Friend, he was hired as chief scientist at Rosetta Inpharmatics, a startup biotech company focused on the generation and analysis of high-dimensional functional genomics data. Merck acquired Rosetta in 2001, which allowed Schadt to combine large-scale molecular profiling with Merck's disease-focused databases to demonstrate the existence of molecular networks working together to give rise to complex system behavior. During this period Schadt developed his theory that single-gene approaches to understanding and treating common human diseases must give way to a network-based approach and that many of the failures in pharmaceutical therapies were caused by an incomplete understanding of biology underlying the therapeutic targets.

Demonstrating the ability to infer causal relationships among features in high dimensional data using DNA variation information, Schadt and his colleagues at Merck began reconstructing predictive networks that were shown to be causally associated with disease, leading to the idea of targeting networks, not single genes, to effectively treat common disorders such as Alzheimer's disease, obesity, and most forms of cancer. A Merck spokesman said that the papers Schadt began publishing based on this genetic network data “changed the way people looked at disease.” Schadt used the information about these networks to determine which genes Merck should pursue as targets; by the time he left the company, Schadt estimated that his group was responsible for half the drugs in the company's development pipeline.

In 2009, along with Stephen Friend, Schadt founded Sage Bionetworks, a nonprofit organization with the goal of encouraging collaboration between academic and commercial scientists in performing network-based studies of disease and making the data publicly available. When Merck closed down the Rosetta business unit, it donated the data, research, and computer equipment from that unit to Sage Bionetworks. Schadt remains involved as a board member.

Also in 2009, Schadt joined DNA sequencing company Pacific Biosciences as the chief scientific officer. During his time there, Schadt demonstrated the application of SMRT sequencing technology for various applications, including to sequence bacterial genomes of public health concern to provide real-time information about these pathogenic strains during an active outbreak. He led research projects to resolve the origins of the Haitian cholera outbreak strain from 2010 and to characterize the highly virulent German E. coli outbreak strain in the summer of 2011. He also demonstrated the ability to infer epigenetic changes from the sequencing data, uncovering novel regulatory mechanisms that may impact pathogenicity and virulence of bacteria of concern in public health.

=== Mount Sinai ===
In 2011, Schadt joined the Mount Sinai School of Medicine in New York, where he founded the new Icahn Institute for Genomics and Multiscale Biology and became chair of the Department of Genetics and Genomics Sciences. The new institute was launched with $100 million for the first five years and is co-directed by Andrew Kasarskis. Schadt has said that his interest in joining Mt. Sinai was to bring predictive modeling of biology to patients. In his time at the institute, he has opened the first CLIA-certified next-generation sequencing lab in New York City and established the first class at the school in which students sequence their own genomes. Schadt also serves on the executive committee of the New York Genome Center.

In 2013, Schadt and his team were awarded a grant from the National Institutes of Health to study biological networks in Alzheimer's disease. They also published a paper in Cell reporting that a network of genes linked to inflammatory response plays a role in late-onset Alzheimer's disease. Also that year, Schadt joined the Cure Alzheimer's Fund's Research Consortium along with Richard L. Huganir.

Schadt's team was cited as the reason the Icahn School of Medicine at Mount Sinai was named #5 of the top 10 most innovative organizations in big data by Fast Company in a 2014 ranking. According to the article, "The New York City hospital is bringing on top Silicon Valley talent to build a facility that will map patients’ genomes to predict diseases, reduce the number of average hospital visits, and streamline electronic medical records."

In May 2014, Schadt and his team announced the Resilience Project in collaboration with Sage Bionetworks. The project intended to perform genotyping on as many as 1 million people to find protective biological mechanisms that prevent disease-causing genetic mutations from becoming active. Participants were to be healthy people age 30 and older, and the project initially targeted variations linked to 127 Mendelian diseases. Based on an analysis of publicly available data, scientists in the Resilience Project estimated that one person in 15,000 has a protective mechanism preventing activity of disease-causing genetic variants. The project led to a paper published in 2016 in Nature Biotechnology, reporting the analysis of nearly 600,000 genomes and the identification of individuals resilient to severe Mendelian childhood diseases.

=== Sema4 ===
Schadt founded Sema4, "a patient-centered health intelligence company dedicated to advancing healthcare through data-driven insights," in June 2017. The company uses Centrellis™, their health analytics platform, to build predictive models of human health and generate personalized medicine insights. Sema4, which was named one of the 150 most promising private digital health companies in the world by CB Insights in its 2020 Digital Health 150 ranking, operates two state-of-the art clinical laboratories in Connecticut, including a 70,000-square-foot facility opened in December 2020 The company announced in February 2021 that it would be going public through a merger with CM Life Sciences, a special purpose acquisition company (SPAC).

== Media appearances and awards ==
Schadt has appeared on CNN, CNBC, BBC, Bloomberg Radio, and Bloomberg TV. He and his scientific projects have been profiled in the New York Times, Esquire magazine, Bloomberg BusinessWeek, among others, and several scientific trade publications. The Huffington Post published a commentary by Schadt, calling on scientists to incorporate information about RNA, proteins, metabolites and more into their genetic or clinical research, while asking the public to participate in research projects to help speed scientific discovery. Schadt has also spoken at numerous events including TEDMED, the health/medicine edition of the world-famous TED conference.

He has received many awards, including the Thomson Reuters World's Most Influential Scientific Minds Award and the Merck Presidential Fellowship Award. He was executive producer and creative director of a documentary film called “The New Biology” that won a Cine Master Series Award in 2012. In 2020, Schadt was named the BioCT Entrepreneur of the Year.

== Selected publications ==
Schadt has published more than 370 peer-reviewed papers. He is a highly cited author, with an h-index of 129 and more than 145,500 citations. Some notable publications include:

- A Nature Genetics paper that was selected by Science as one of the top 10 breakthroughs of the year in 2005.
- The first publication linking a full-genome scan of methylation to a genome sequence for the E. coli microbe.
- One of the earliest publications using microarrays to annotate the human genome.
- An editorial in Molecular Systems Biology on privacy concerns in the genome era calling for improved education of legislators, expanded non-discrimination laws, and protection of patients' rights.
- A publication in Nature Genetics predicting a shift from genome-wide association studies to integrative, network-based association studies (INAS) that take into account more types of biological data in order to discern the cause of variation in traits and diseases.
- A 2017 Nature Genetics paper reporting the use of functional genomics predictive network models to identify regulators of inflammatory bowel disease (IBD).
