= Andrew Kasarskis =

American biologist

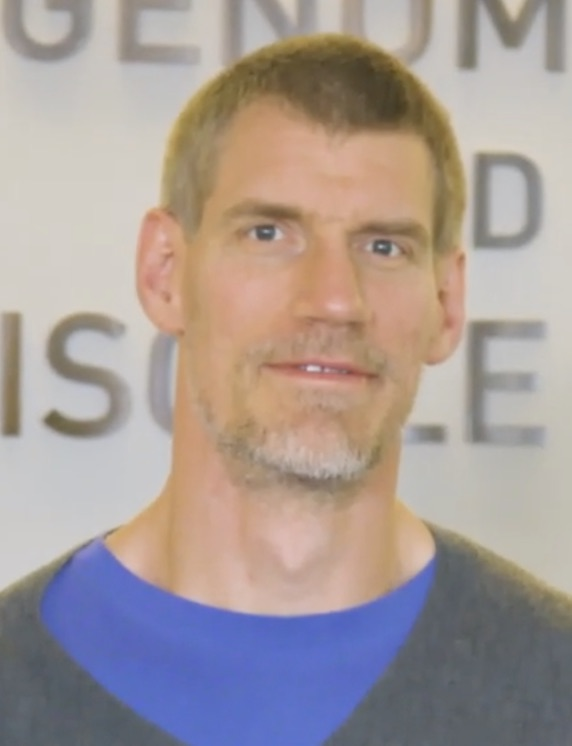
- Born: November 2, 1972 (age 53); Madison, Wisconsin
- Citizenship: American
- Education: University of Kentucky; University of California, Berkeley
- Scientific career
- Fields: Bioinformatics, genomics
- Workplaces: Sema4

Andrew Kasarskis (born November 2, 1972) is an American biologist. He is the Chief Data Officer (CDO) at Sema4. He was previously CDO and an Executive Vice President (EVP) at the Mount Sinai Health System in New York City and, before that, vice chair of the Department of Genetics and Genomic Sciences and Co-director of the Icahn Institute for Genomics and Multiscale Biology at the Icahn School of Medicine at Mount Sinai. Kasarskis is known for taking a network-based approach to biology and for directing the first medical school class offering students the opportunity to fully sequence and analyze their own genomes.

== Early life and education ==
Kasarskis completed bachelor's degrees in chemistry and biology at the University of Kentucky in 1992. In 1998, he completed his PhD in molecular and cell biology at the University of California, Berkeley, under the supervision of Kathryn Anderson.

== Career and research ==
Throughout his career in industry and academia, Kasarskis' research has focused on the use of genetic and genomic data together with high-performance computing and advanced analytical tools to address biomedical needs and improve clinical treatment.

After completing his PhD in 1998, Kasarskis worked at Stanford University for two years, contributing to the development of various genome databases. In 2000, he entered industry, working in computational biology at DoubleTwist and later Rosetta Inpharmatics (acquired by Merck Research Laboratories). His work there centered on generating and mining complex biological data sets and using that information to build, predict, and model human disease. Kasarskis also worked for Sage Bionetworks and Pacific Biosciences before returning to academia.

In 2011, Kasarskis became Vice Chair of the Department of Genetics and Genomic Sciences at the Icahn School of Medicine at Mount Sinai and Co-director, along with Eric Schadt, of the Icahn Institute for Genomics and Multiscale Biology, where Kasarskis's research focuses on improving health outcomes through better data mining, and his research program includes sequencing-based pathogen surveillance; pharmacogenomics; electronic health records; and systems biology of sleep, behavior, and stress. In 2019, Kasarskis was appointed Chief Data Officer and Executive Vice President of Mount Sinai Health System, where he leads efforts to improve clinical data infrastructure and leverage data to improve patient outcomes while accelerating research and innovation.

Kasarskis is known for directing the first graduate course that allowed medical and PhD students to fully sequence and analyze their own genomes, along with co-instructors Michael Linderman, George Diaz, Ali Bashir, and Randi Zinberg. He has said that courses like this will be critical for training teams of people capable of performing this type of analysis in a medical setting. He chose whole genome sequencing because he expects the more limited exome sequencing will not be a relevant technological approach in the long term.

Kasarskis has called for improvements to informed consent protocols in patient research based on the concept that studies involving DNA cannot fully be made anonymous. He was quoted in the journal Nature saying, "We need to move beyond an assumption that you cannot be identified from the data that exist about you and really work to make sure that we're protecting people's rights in ways that allow us to use the data that are out there for individuals' and researchers' benefit."

In 2019, Kasarskis joined a five-year collaborative study with Mount Sinai Health System, Sanofi, and Sema4, aimed to provide insights into the biological mechanisms of asthma using diverse data sets such as clinical data, genomics, immunological environmental, and sensor data from devices to carryout advanced network modeling of the disease. Kasarskis reported that understanding the molecular basis of clinical subtypes of asthma in the study would enable better management of asthma and could provide opportunities to discover new treatments for the disease.

In 2020, the molecular pathogen surveillance program Kasarskis had established with Dr. Harm van Bakel and others at the Mount Sinai Health System clearly demonstrated that SARS-CoV2, the virus causing COVID-19, was introduced to the New York Metropolitan Area not from Asia but predominately from Europe, with some contribution from other United States regions. The ensuing research paper was published in the journal Science.

== Selected publications ==
=== Pharmacogenomics ===
- Smith, Catherine C.; Wang, Qi; Chin, Chen-Shan; Salerno, Sara; Damon, Lauren E.; Levis, Mark J.; Perl, Alexander E.; Travers, Kevin J.; Wang, Susana; Hunt, Jeremy P.; Zarrinkar, Patrick P.; Schadt, Eric E.; Kasarskis, Andrew; Kuriyan, John; Shah, Neil P. (2012). "Validation of ITD mutations in FLT3 as a therapeutic target in human acute myeloid leukaemia". Nature. 485 (7397): 260–263. Bibcode:2012Natur.485..260S. doi:10.1038/nature11016. PMC 3390926. PMID 22504184.
- Kasarskis, Andrew; Yang, Xia; Schadt, Eric (2011). "Integrative genomics strategies to elucidate the complexity of drug response". Pharmacogenomics. 12 (12): 1695–1715. doi:10.2217/pgs.11.115. PMID 22118053.
- Gargis, Amy S.; Kalman, Lisa; Berry, Meredith W.; Bick, David P.; Dimmock, David P.; Hambuch, Tina; Lu, Fei; Lyon, Elaine; Voelkerding, Karl V.; Zehnbauer, Barbara A.; Agarwala, Richa; Bennett, Sarah F.; Chen, Bin; Chin, Ephrem L H.; Compton, John G.; Das, Soma; Farkas, Daniel H.; Ferber, Matthew J.; Funke, Birgit H.; Furtado, Manohar R.; Ganova-Raeva, Lilia M.; Geigenmüller, Ute; Gunselman, Sandra J.; Hegde, Madhuri R.; Johnson, Philip L F.; Kasarskis, Andrew; Kulkarni, Shashikant; Lenk, Thomas; Liu, C S Jonathan; et al. (2012). "Assuring the quality of next-generation sequencing in clinical laboratory practice". Nature Biotechnology. 30 (11): 1033–1036. doi:10.1038/nbt.2403. PMC 3827024. PMID 23138292.

=== Pathogens ===
- Gonzalez-Reiche, Ana S. (July 17, 2020). "Introductions and early spread of SARS-CoV-2 in the New York City area". Science. 369 (6501): 297–301. Bibcode:2020Sci...369..297G. doi:10.1126/science.abc1917. PMC 7259823. PMID 32471856.
- Chacko, Kieran; Van Bakel, Harm; Sullivan, Mitchell; Chacko, Andrew; Kasarskis, Collen; Altman, Deena; Ciferri, Brianne; Pak, Theodore; Sebra, Robert (March 27, 2018). "Genetic Basis of Emerging Vancomycin, Linezolid, and Daptomycin Heteroresistance in a Case of Persistent Enterococcus faecium Bacteremia". Antimicrob Agents Chemother. 62 (4). doi:10.1128/AAC.02007-17. PMC 5913925. PMID 29339387.
- Pak, Theodore R.; Kasarskis, Andrew (December 1, 2015). "How next-generation sequencing and multiscale data analysis will transform infectious disease management". Clinical Infectious Diseases. 61 (11): 1695–1702. doi:10.1093/cid/civ670. ISSN 1537-6591. PMC 4643486. PMID 26251049.
- Pak, Theodore R.; Chacko, Kieran I.; O'Donnell, Timothy; Huprikar, Shirish S.; van Bakel, Harm; Kasarskis, Andrew; Scott, Erick R. (December 2017). "Estimating Local Costs Associated With Clostridium difficile Infection Using Machine Learning and Electronic Medical Records". Infection Control and Hospital Epidemiology. 38 (12): 1478–1486. doi:10.1017/ice.2017.214. ISSN 1559-6834. PMC 5923033. PMID 29103378.
- Rasko, David A.; Webster, Dale R.; Sahl, Jason W.; Bashir, Ali; Boisen, Nadia; Scheutz, Flemming; Paxinos, Ellen E.; Sebra, Robert; Chin, Chen-Shan; Iliopoulos, Dimitris; Klammer, Aaron; Peluso, Paul; Lee, Lawrence; Kislyuk, Andrey O.; Bullard, James; Kasarskis, Andrew; Wang, Susanna; Eid, John; Rank, David; Redman, Julia C.; Steyert, Susan R.; Frimodt-Møller, Jakob; Struve, Carsten; Petersen, Andreas M.; Krogfelt, Karen A.; Nataro, James P.; Schadt, Eric E.; Waldor, Matthew K. (2011). "Origins of the E. coli Strain Causing an Outbreak of Hemolytic–Uremic Syndrome in Germany". New England Journal of Medicine. 365 (8): 709–717. doi:10.1056/NEJMoa1106920. PMC 3168948. PMID 21793740.
- Chin, Chen-Shan; Sorenson, Jon; Harris, Jason B.; Robins, William P.; Charles, Richelle C.; Jean-Charles, Roger R.; Bullard, James; Webster, Dale R.; Kasarskis, Andrew; Peluso, Paul; Paxinos, Ellen E.; Yamaichi, Yoshiharu; Calderwood, Stephen B.; Mekalanos, John J.; Schadt, Eric E.; Waldor, Matthew K. (2011). "The origin of the Haitian cholera outbreak strain". New England Journal of Medicine. 364 (1): 33–42. doi:10.1056/NEJMoa1012928. PMC 3030187. PMID 21142692.

=== Complex disease ===
- Scarpa, Joseph R.; Jiang, Peng; Losic, Bojan; Readhead, Ben; Gao, Vance D.; Dudley, Joel T.; Vitaterna, Martha H.; Turek, Fred W.; Kasarskis, Andrew (July 2016). "Systems Genetic Analyses Highlight a TGFβ-FOXO3 Dependent Striatal Astrocyte Network Conserved across Species and Associated with Stress, Sleep, and Huntington's Disease". PLOS Genetics. 12 (7) e1006137. doi:10.1371/journal.pgen.1006137. ISSN 1553-7404. PMC 4938493. PMID 27390852.
- Michlmayr, Daniela; Pak, Theodore R.; Rahman, Adeeb H.; Amir, El-Ad David; Kim, Eun-Young; Kim-Schulze, Seunghee; Suprun, Maria; Stewart, Michael G.; Thomas, Guajira P. (August 27, 2018). "Comprehensive innate immune profiling of chikungunya virus infection in pediatric cases". Molecular Systems Biology. 14 (8) e7862. doi:10.15252/msb.20177862. ISSN 1744-4292. PMC 6110311. PMID 30150281.
- Brunner, JI; Gotter, AL; Millstein, J; Garson, S; Binns, J; Fox, SV; Savitz, AT; Yang, HS; Fitzpatrick, K; Zhou, L; Owens, JR; Webber, AL; Vitaterna, MH; Kasarskis, A; Uebele, VN; Turek, F; Renger, JJ; Winrow, CJ (2011). "Pharmacological validation of candidate causal sleep genes identified in an N2 cross". Journal of Neurogenetics. 25 (4): 167–81. doi:10.3109/01677063.2011.628426. PMC 3568991. PMID 22091728.
