= CHGB =

CHGB may refer to:

- CHGB-FM, a radio station (97.7 FM) licensed to Wasaga Beach, Ontario, Canada
- CHGB, a former AM station in La Pocatière, Quebec, which became CHOX-FM in 1990
- CHGB (gene)
- Chinese National Human Genome Center, Beijing
