= List of genetics research organizations =

This is a list of organizations involved in genetics research.

== Africa ==
=== Kenya ===
- International Livestock Research Institute (ILRI), Nairobi

=== Namibia ===
- The Life Technologies Conservation Genetics Laboratory (Cheetah Conservation Fund), Otjiwarongo

== Asia ==
=== Malaysia ===
- Malaysian Genomics Resource Centre (MGRC)
- Genetics & Regenerative Medicine Research Centre (GRMRC)
- Malaysia Genome and Vaccine Institute (MGVI)
- Medical Genetics Unit, Universiti Putra Malaysia

=== Pakistan ===
- IBGE
- Institute of Biomedical and Genetic Engineering

=== China ===
- BGI Group
- Chinese National Human Genome Center

=== India ===
- Institute of Genomics and Integrative Biology
- DNA Labs India
- National Institute of Biomedical Genomics

=== Iran ===
- Royan Institute

=== Philippines ===
- Philippine Genome Center
- International Rice Research Institute

=== Singapore ===
- Genome Institute of Singapore
- Institute of Molecular and Cell Biology

=== Taiwan ===
- National Health Research Institutes

=== Japan ===
- National Institute of Genetics
- Okinawa Institute of Science and Technology
- RIKEN

=== United Arab Emirates ===
- DNA Labs UAE

== Europe ==
=== Germany ===
- Max Planck Institute for Molecular Genetics

=== Italy ===
- Bioversity International

=== Sweden ===
- Science for Life Laboratory

=== United Kingdom ===
- The Genome Analysis Centre
- Wellcome Sanger Institute
- Wellcome Centre for Human Genetics (University of Oxford)

=== Russia ===
Research Centre for Medical Genetics (RCMG), Moscow

== North America ==
=== Canada ===
- The Centre for Applied Genomics (University of Toronto)

=== United States ===
- Arizona
  - Translational Genomics Research Institute
- California
  - Arc Institute
  - Clear Labs
  - Genetic Information Research Institute
  - Joint Genome Institute (U.S. Department of Energy)
  - Salk Institute for Biological Studies
- Illinois
  - Carl R. Woese Institute for Genomic Biology (University of Illinois, Urbana-Champaign)
- Maine
  - The Jackson Laboratory
- Maryland
  - Howard Hughes Medical Institute
  - J. Craig Venter Institute
  - Kennedy Krieger Institute
  - National Human Genome Research Institute
  - USC Institute Of Translational Genomics
- Massachusetts
  - Broad Institute (Massachusetts Institute of Technology and Harvard University)
  - Dana–Farber Cancer Institute
  - Whitehead Institute for Biomedical Research (Massachusetts Institute of Technology)
- Missouri
  - McDonnell Genome Institute (Washington University in St. Louis)
- New Mexico
  - National Center for Genome Resources
- New York
  - Cold Spring Harbor Laboratory
  - Icahn Institute for Genomics and Multiscale Biology (Icahn School of Medicine)
  - New York Genome Center
  - International Society for Transgenic Technologies
- North Carolina
  - Metabolon, Inc
- South Carolina
  - Clemson Center for Human Genetics
  - Greenwood Genetic Center
- Texas
  - Human Genome Sequencing Center (Baylor College of Medicine)
- Utah
  - ARUP Laboratories (University of Utah)
- Washington
  - NW Genomics Center (University of Washington)

== Oceania ==
=== Australia ===
- Australian Genomics Health Alliance
- Commonwealth Scientific and Industrial Research Organisation
- Garvan Institute of Medical Research

== South America ==
=== Brazil ===
- Human Genome and Stem Cell Research Center (HUG-CELL), São Paulo

== Genetic research watchdog organizations ==
- GeneWatch, UK
- Council for Responsible Genetics, US
- Sunshine Project, Hamburg, Germany, and Austin, Texas
