= Kenston High School =

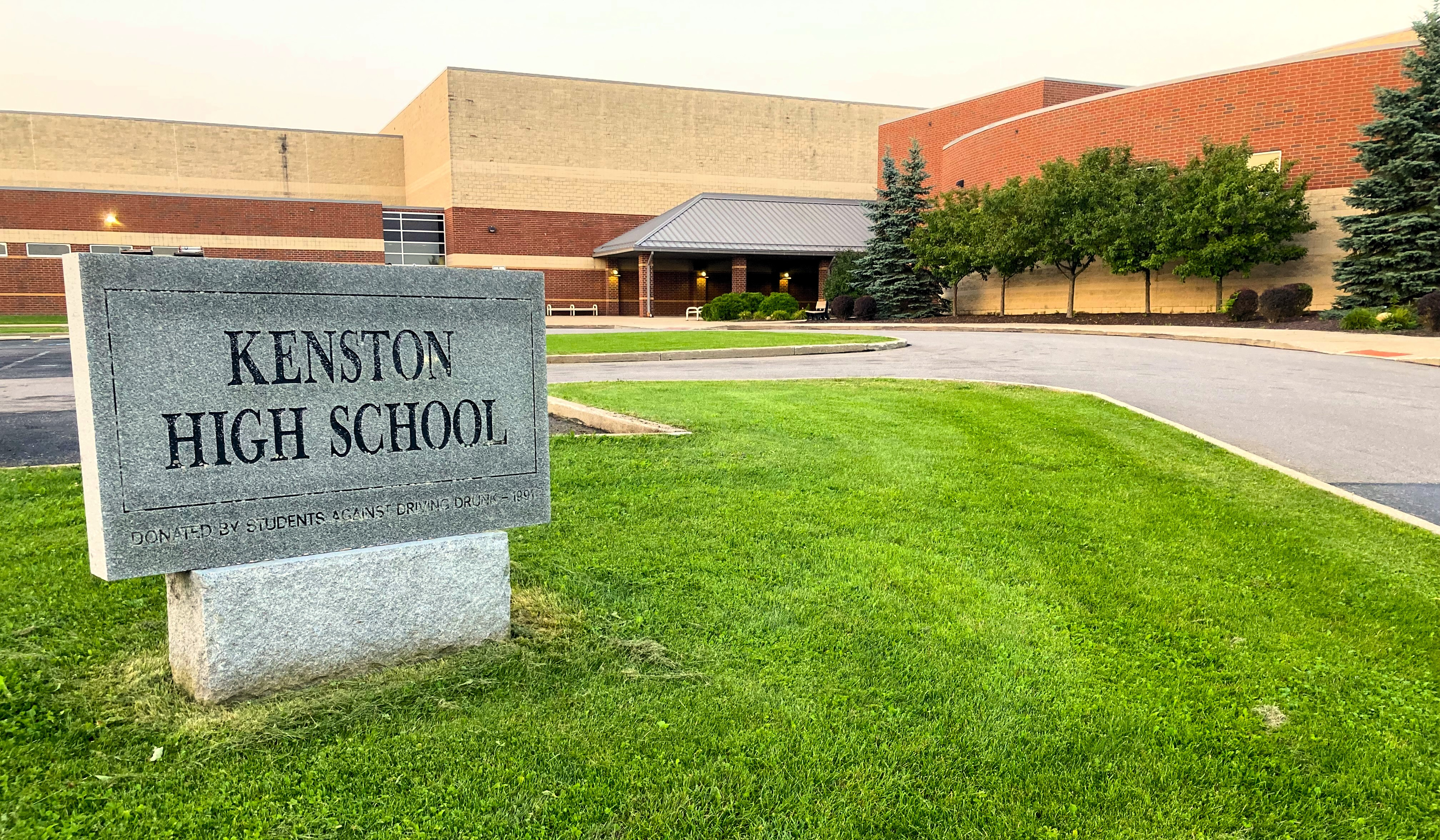

Location
- 9500 Bainbridge Road; Chagrin Falls, Ohio 44023; United States; 41°23′32″N 81°18′12″W

Information
- Type: Public
- Motto: Bombers Fly High
- Opened: 1953
- School district: Kenston Local School District
- Principal: Tom Gabram
- Teaching staff: 54.00 (FTE)
- Grades: 9–12
- Enrollment: 789 (2023-2024)
- Student to teacher ratio: 14.61
- Campus type: Rural
- Colors: Blue and White
- Athletics conference: Suburban League American
- Nickname: Bombers
- Website: kenstonlocal.org/o/khs

Kenston High School is a public high school located in Bainbridge Township, Ohio. It is the only high school in the Kenston Local School District. Their nickname is the Bombers, and they compete in the Suburban League American as a member of the Ohio High School Athletic Association.

== History ==
Opened in 1953, Kenston was formed following the consolidation of the Auburn and Bainbridge school districts. The name of "Kenston" was chosen from "Kent's Town", a name of the area that covered parts of both Auburn and Bainbridge Townships prior to the creation of the townships. "Bainburn" was also considered. At the time, high school students from Auburn were attending Bainbridge High School on a tuition basis. The nickname of the "Bombers" was carried over from Bainbridge High School and had originally been chosen in the 1940s as the B-25 bombers could be seen flying over the school to and from the nearby Ravenna Arsenal.

In 2006 the high school moved to a new building on the same campus. The previous KHS building became Kenston Middle School.

== Athletics ==
=== State championships ===
- Boys cross country - 1983
- Football - 2018
- Boys wrestling – 1972
- Boys soccer – 1987
- Baseball - 2023

== Notable alumni ==
- Stefan Dechant, Academy Award-nominated production designer and art director
- Aaron "Aalias" Kleinstub, musician, producer of top hit “The Monster” (Class of 2007)
- Jack Rudnay, NFL player for the Kansas City Chiefs
- Tyson Walter, Ohio State and NFL player
- Scott Weiland, lead singer of the Stone Temple Pilots (did not graduate from Kenston)
- Mary Whyte, watercolorist (Class of 1972)
