= International Society for Transgenic Technologies =

- Abbreviation: ISTT
- Formation: 2006; 20 years ago
- Founder: Lluís Montoliu, Belén Pintado
- Founded at: 2006 in Spain (incorporated in 2013 in the USA)
- Type: Scientific society
- Purpose: To foster and stimulate research, communication, and technology exchange in transgenic technologies
- Headquarters: Kansas City (KS), USA
- Region served: Worldwide
- Members: ca. 725 members (as of November 2026)
- President: Aimee Stablewski
- Vice president: Fabien Delerue
- Main organ: Transgenic Research
- Website: www.transtechsociety.org

The International Society for Transgenic Technologies (ISTT) is an organization dedicated to advancing research, communication, and technology exchange regarding transgenic technologies.

== Purpose ==
- Support for scientific research and education in the field of generating genetically modified model organisms in adherence with the 3Rs principles.
- Promotion of science and technology used in the generation and analysis of genetically modified organisms for biomedical research and biotechnological application.
- Providing the organizational framework for a scientific community that includes academic and industrial scientists, students and technical assistants, and in general, any individuals with an interest in the generation of and the analysis of genetically modified organisms.
- Providing a communication and knowledge sharing platform that brings together scientists from academic research and industry, as well as research technology experts.
- Organization of a regular international scientific conference entitled "Transgenic Technology Meeting".
- Publication of specialist information in the form of books, protocols, and other specialist texts in the field of transgenic technologies.
- Organization and promotion of courses, seminars, and other educational activities for training in transgenic technologies.
- Cooperation with other national and international societies with similar aims (e.g., IMGS, AALAS, AAALAC, FELASA).
- Providing information to the public about the benefits associated with using and applying transgenic technologies.
- Providing local, national and international bodies with expert advice and guidance on scientific, technical or other aspects of generating genetically modified organisms.

== Resources and education ==
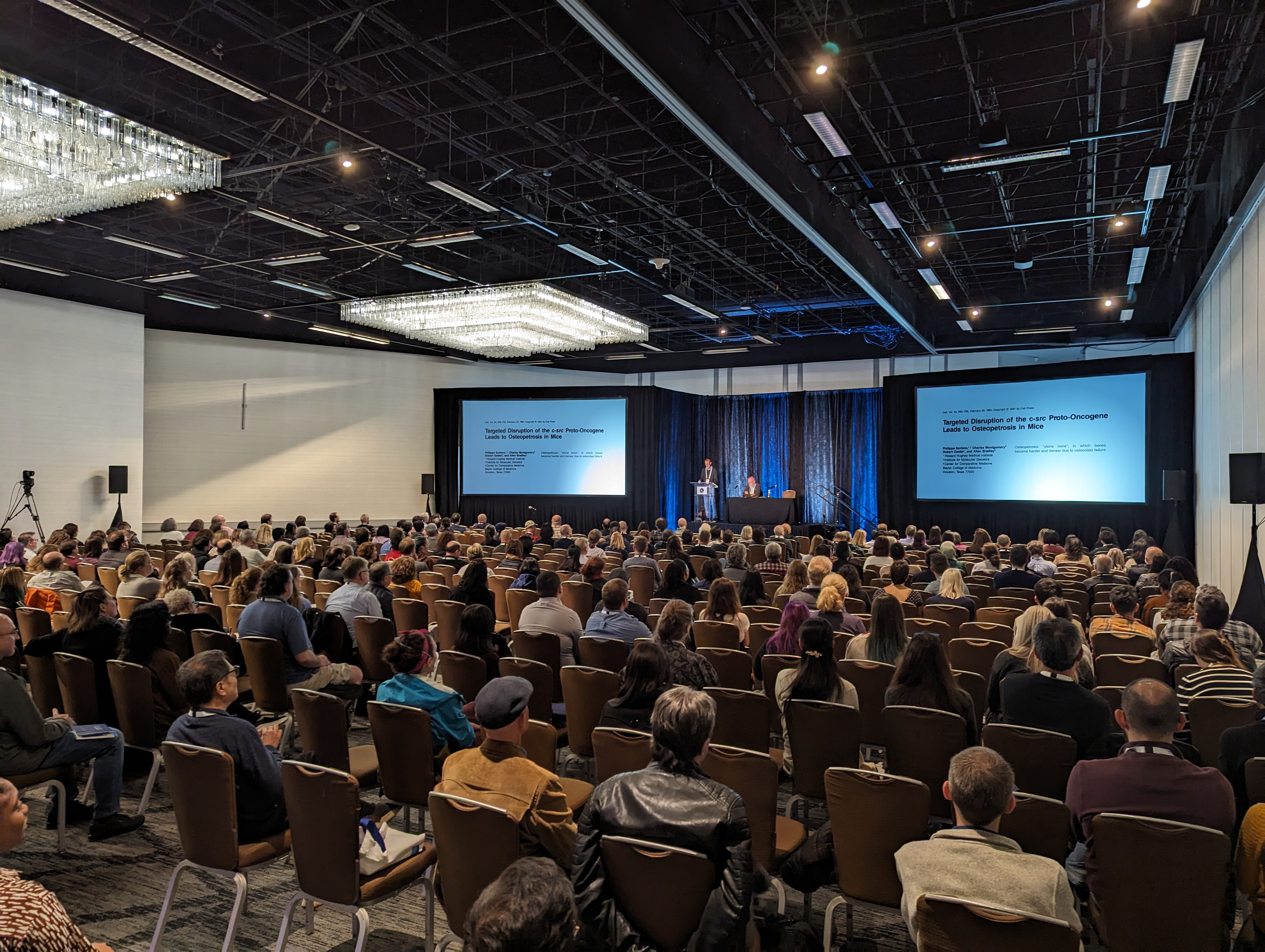
18th Transgenic Technology Meeting 2023 in Houston, USA

Every one and a half years the ISTT organizes an international scientific conference, the Transgenic Technology Meeting, also known as the TT Meeting. To promote communication and technology exchange, the website of the society publishes information and protocols related to transgenic technologies as well as the locations of transgenic service facilities, recognized as a valuable resource in the scientific literature. A collection of ISTT subject-related protocols has been published in the book Advanced Protocols for Animal Transgenesis – an ISTT Manual. The society is also associated with the peer-reviewed scientific journal Transgenic Research, which publishes scientific findings on transgenic and genome-edited higher model organisms. As a platform for the rapid exchange of scientific information, the ISTT hosts two mailing lists, the public transgenic-list (often referred to as tg-l) and the ISTT-list reserved for ISTT members with around 1500 and 700 participants (May 2025).

=== History of Transgenic Technology meetings ===
Year	Venue	Country	Citation
2028	Montreal	Canada	
2026	Leiden	Netherlands	
2025	Zurich	Switzerland	
2023	Houston	USA	
2022	Helsinki	Finland	
2020	Rehovot	Israel	
2019	Kobe	Japan	
2017	Salt Lake City	USA	
2016	Prague	Czech Republic	
2014	Edinburgh	Scotland	
2013	Guangzhou	China	
2011	St. Pete Beach	USA	
2010	Berlin	Germany	
2008	Toronto	Canada	
2007	Brisbane	Australia	
2005	Barcelona	Spain	
2004	Uppsala	Sweden	
2001	Stockholm	Sweden	

== Presidents ==
- Aimee Stablewski (since 2026)
- Rebecca Haffner-Krausz (2023–2026)
- Ernst Martin Füchtbauer (2020–2023)
- Wojtek Auerbach (2017–2019)
- Jan Parker-Thornburg (2014–2016)
- Lluís Montoliu (2006–2014)

== Awards ==
=== ISTT Prize ===
The ISTT Prize recognizes individuals for their outstanding contributions to the field of transgenic technologies and is presented at the Transgenic Technology Meeting. Prominent winners included Ralph Brinster (2011), Janet Rossant (2014), Mario Capecchi (2017) and Rudolf Jaenisch (2025).

=== ISTT Young Investigator Award ===
The ISTT Young Investigator Award recognizes outstanding achievements by young scientists whose work is advancing the field of transgenic technologies with new ideas and who have recently received an academic degree. The ISTT Young Investigator Award is presented at the Transgenic Technology Meetings. Prominent winners included Feng Zhang (2014) and Alexis Komor (2017) for their work on genome editing in model organisms.

=== 3Rs Award ===
The 3Rs Award recognizes outstanding achievements by a researcher or research team that advances the field of transgenic technologies with new methods and improvements in strict accordance with the 3Rs principles for reduction, refinement, and replacement of animals used in research. The prize is awarded during the Transgenic Technology Meetings.

== See also ==
- International Mammalian Genome Society
- List of genetics research organizations
