= Transgenic Research =

- Cover of Transgenic Research
- Discipline: Genetically modified organisms
- Language: English
- Edited by: Johannes Buyel and Simon Lillico

Publication details
- History: 1991 – present
- Publisher: Springer
- Frequency: Continuous Article Publishing
- Impact factor: 1.9 (2025)

Standard abbreviations
- ISO 4: Transgenic Res.

Indexing
- CODEN: TRSEES
- ISSN: 0962-8819 (print); 1573-9368 (web)
- OCLC no.: 525604217

Links
- Journal homepage

Transgenic Research, international in scope, is a bimonthly, peer-reviewed, scientific journal, published by Springer. The co-editors-in-chief are Johannes Buyel and Simon Lillico.

== Scope ==
Transgenic Research focuses on transgenic and genome edited higher organisms. Manuscripts emphasizing biotechnological applications are strongly encouraged. Intellectual property, ethical issues, societal impact and regulatory aspects also fall within the scope of the journal. Transgenic Research aims to bridge the gap between fundamental and applied science in molecular biology and biotechnology for the plant and animal academic and associated industry communities.

The journal is associated with the International Society for Transgenic Technologies (ISTT).

Transgenic Research publishes

Research Should describe novel research involving the production, characterization and application of genetically altered animals or plants. Reports of transient results may be considered if they have a clear focus or application in permanently modified multicellular organisms.

Reviews Should critically summarize the current state-of-the-art of the subject in a dispassionate way. Authors are requested to contact a board member before submission. Reviews should not be descriptive; rather they should present the most up-to-date information on the subject in a dispassionate and critical way. Perspective Reviews which can address new or controversial aspects are encouraged.

Comment Similar to reviews, this article type should refer to one or several recently published articles or topics currently under debate in the respective scientific community. The editorial board should be contacted before submission as described for reviews.

Brief Report Should be short reports describing substantial developments in experiments involving transgenic or genome-edited multi-cellular organisms that are highly relevant for the research community and require a fast dissemination.

Methodology Should describe in detail the development of new methods to generate, analyze or select transgenic or genome-edited multicellular organisms in a way that is advantageous compared to the current state of the art, including explicit benchmarking against existing gold-standards where appropriate.

Protocol Should provide an in-depth, step-by-step description of relevant methods that allow successful reproduction in other laboratories without the need for additional details or information. Providing a brief description of typical results as well as a precise trouble-shooting guide is expected.

== Abstracting and indexing ==
This journal is listed in the following databases:

- Thomoson Reuters databases:

- Biochemistry and Biophysics Citation Index
- BIOSIS – Biological Abstracts
- Biotechnology Citation Index
- Current Contents/ Life Sciences
- Journal Citation Reports/Science Edition
- Science Citation Index
- SciSearch

- CABI Direct

- CAB Abstracts
- CAB International
- Global Health

- EBSCO

- Environment Index

- Elsevier Biobase

- Current Awareness in Biological Sciences (CABS)
- EMBASE
- EMBiology

- Chemical Abstracts Service (CAS) – CASSI
- CSA/Proquest
- Derwent Biotechnology Resource
- Gale
- Google Scholar
- IBIDS
- OCLC
- PASCAL
- PubMed/MEDLINE
- Scopus
- Summon by Serial Solutions
- VINITI Database RAS
