= Mary Whyte =

American watercolor artist

- Born: 1953 (age 72–73); Cleveland, Ohio, US
- Occupation: Watercolor painting
- Spouse: Arnold Nemirow
- Awards: Portrait Society of America Gold Medal Award
- Website: Mary Whyte

Mary Whyte (born 1953 in Cleveland, Ohio) is an American watercolor artist, a traditionalist preferring a representational style, and the author of seven published books.

== Early life ==
Whyte was raised in Bainbridge Township, Ohio. She is the daughter of Betty and Donald Whyte. The nearby town was Chagrin Falls, where she would ride her bike to use the library. From a young age, Whyte aspired to becoming an artist. Whyte graduated from Kenston High School in Bainbridge.

== Career ==
In 2013, Whyte was awarded by the state of South Carolina, the South Carolina Governor's Award for the Arts. In 2016, the Portrait Society of America chose Whyte as the 2016 recipient of the Society's gold medal, their highest honor of "a lifelong dedication to excellence, as well as in recognition of a distinguished body of work that serves to foster and enhance fine art portraiture and figurative works in America."

Whyte's Working South, was an exhibition of 50 paintings of people working in vanishing industries throughout the southern United States, began in 2013 and toured for four years. "Mary Whyte is the artist of record of a changing world ... a world she's captured in a style all her own," says CBS News. In Whyte's Working South exhibition that aired on CBS Sunday Morning, Whyte proclaimed about her work: "Getting a likeness is the easy part, making a good painting that endures, that speaks forever is the difficult part."

In 2017, Whyte painted a portrait of Professor Ralph L. Brinster in his laboratory, which was featured in an article titled Mary Whyte: Observer.

In 2019, Whyte's exhibit, We the People: Portraits of Veterans in America features 50 watercolor paintings, one veteran portrait representing each state. The exhibition traveled through 2022. Whyte's gallery of veterans included a retired carpenter from Hawaii, a rancher from New Mexico, a construction worker from Houston, among others.

Whyte has exhibited nationally including the Greenville County Museum of Art, Butler Institute of American Art, Gibbes Museum of Art, The Salmagundi Club, National Arts Club, Mennello Museum of American Art, Telfair Museums, Morris Museum of Art, Fred & Pamela Buffett Cancer Center and internationally in the China and Foreign Countries International Watercolour Summit at the Nanning Art Gallery in Nanning China, and Thailand in the World Watermedia Exposition.

Whyte formed a friendship with Alfreda Gibbs Smiley LaBoard from Johns Island in Charleston County, South Carolina, as well as with the Presbyterian church located on Johns Island. LaBoard became one of the primary models for the artist.

== Published works ==
- We The People, University of South Carolina Press, 2019 ISBN 978-1-64336-011-9
- Down Bohicket Road, University of South Carolina Press, 2012 ISBN 978-1-61117-100-6
- Working South, University of South Carolina Press, 2011 ISBN 978-1-57003-966-9
- Painting Portraits and Figures in Watercolor, Watson-Guptill, 2011 ISBN 978-0-8230-2673-9
- An Artist's Way of Seeing, Gibbs Smith, 2005 ISBN 978-0941711753
- Alfreda's World, Wyrick and Company, 2003 ISBN 978-0941711777
- Watercolor for the Serious Beginner, Watson-Guptill, 1997 ISBN 978-0823056606
