= Stephen Friend =

American scientist

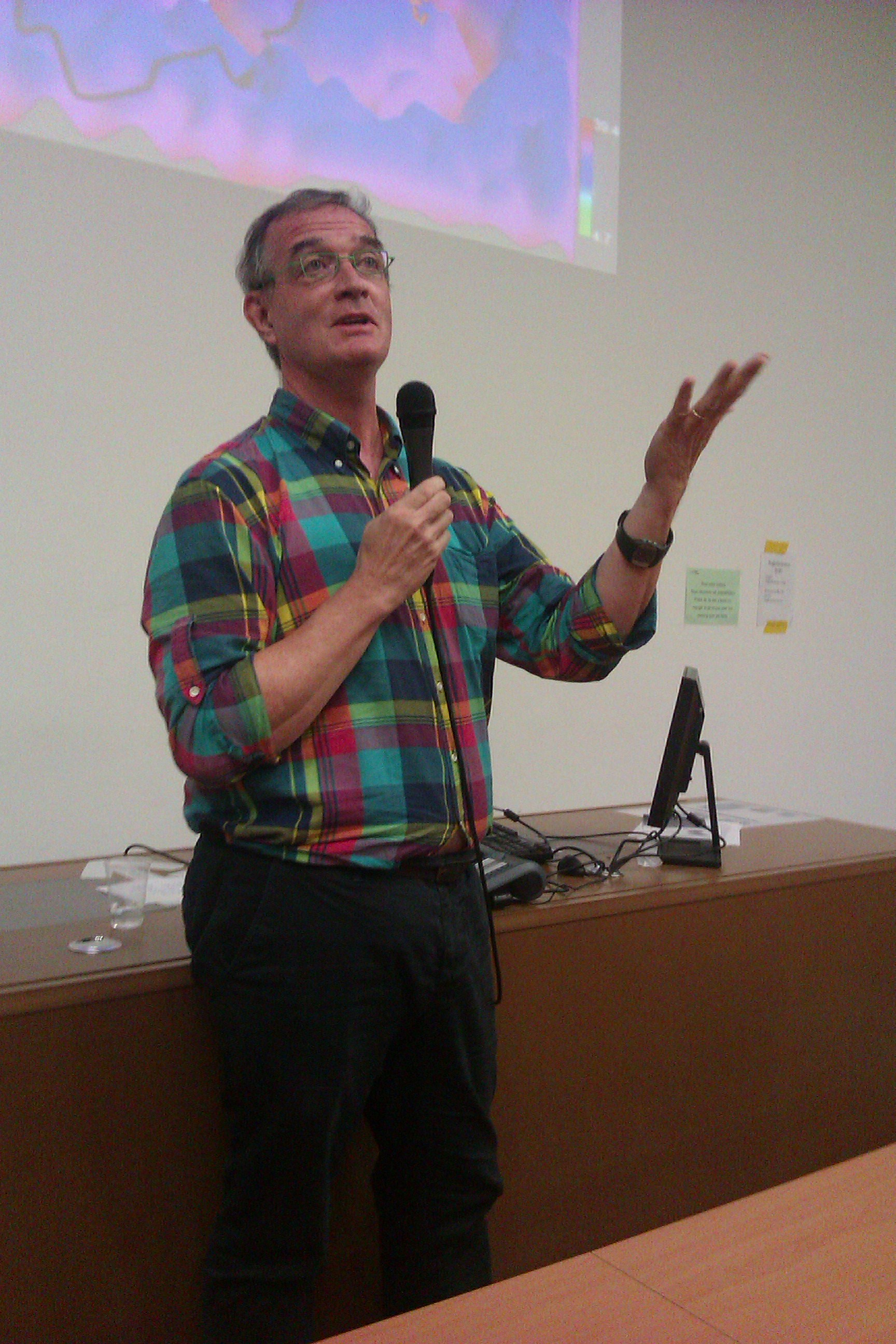
- Stephen Friend at NightScience 2013 in Paris
- Born: December 10, 1953; United States
- Education: Indiana University (PhD in Biochemistry); Indiana University School of Medicine (MD)
- Occupations: Clinician, scientist
- Known for: Genetic resilience, cancer biology, wearable digital health technology

Stephen H. Friend (born December 10, 1953) is an American clinician and scientist who has focused on genetic resilience, cancer biology, and other methods to improve drug discovery, open science, and wearable digital health technology. He is currently the President and co-founder of the nonprofit 4YouandMe and a Visiting Professor of Connected Medicine in the Department of Psychiatry at Oxford University.

== Career ==
Both of Friend's parents were on the staff and faculty at the Juilliard School. Friend received his undergraduate degree with Honors in Philosophy and Anthropology (1975). He received his PhD in Biochemistry: "Electrostatic and Hydrophobic forces in Myoglobin and Hemoglobin" (1979) and MD (1981) from Indiana University, before doing his Pediatric fellowship at the Children's Hospital of Philadelphia (1981-1984). He moved to Boston where he did his Pediatric Hematology and Oncology Fellowship at the Children's Hospital of Boston, and the Dana Farber Cancer Center - while doing his postdoctoral fellowship as a Visiting Scientist with Robert Weinberg at the MIT Whitehead Institute (1985-1989). He was on the Faculty of the Children's Hospital of Boston, the Dana Farber Cancer Center, and the Massachusetts General Hospital as an Associate Professor (1993).

Since then, he has held faculty positions at the Fred Hutchinson Cancer Center, Seattle (1994-1998); as Professor Department of Pathology, University of Washington, Seattle (1995-1998); Affiliate Investigator at the Fred Hutchinson Cancer Center, Seattle (2009-2016); Professor of Genetics, Icahn School of Medicine, NY (2014-2016); and Visiting Professor, Lund University, Sweden (2014-2016), until now when he is a Visiting Professor in the Department of Psychiatry, Oxford University, UK (2018–present).

In 1996, he co-founded with Leroy Hood and Leland Hartwell and later led Rosetta Inpharmatics, where they developed approaches to assess the effects of compounds in drug discovery and the aggressiveness of breast cancers now used across the world.

Friend was the senior author of the paper that used expression profiles to detect who had aggressive breast cancer, which has over the last decades been at the core of the now widely approved assays that Mammaprint uses to screen many women with breast cancer. At Rosetta, they also developed machine learning tools to map signalling pathways using expression profiles and yeast gene knockouts that are the early examples of using deep biologic data sets to query the informational circuits in cells that are widely used today. Merck & Co., Inc. acquired Rosetta in 2001 for almost two-thirds of a billion dollars.

Friend joined Merck & Co. as head of Advanced Technology and soon became SVP for Oncology.

Friend worked at Apple from 2014 to 2017 on their health team, co-reporting to COO Jeff Williams on aspects of health strategy. While at Apple, Friend worked on Apple's healthcare initiatives, including their software frameworks ResearchKit, CareKit, and HealthKit.

After working at Apple, Friend co-founded 4YouandMe and is currently President of the company. In 2025 4YouandMe began work with a CZI Rare As One study to design and pilot apps that allow patients with five rare diseases, including Long COVID and Sarcoidosis, to use digital health tools to monitor their symptoms.

Friend now works on using smartphones and wearables to accurately follow conditions, understand the role of stress, to enable the monitoring of diseases.

== Sage Bionetworks ==
In 2008, Friend co-founded and led the nonprofit Sage Bionetworks to change how researchers work together. The aim of the nonprofit was to change the way drug discovery is done to improve patient wait times.

At Sage, Friend and his colleagues developed efforts by which separate principal investigators across separate academic institutions could jointly work on a single project without assigning who would be the first authors. This "Federated" approach resulted in one of the first and still widely used approaches to determine a person's age using methylation patterns. Friend joined efforts with Gustavo Stolovitzky to design and carry out open Big Data Challenges to solve hard bioinformatic puzzles, "The Sage Dream Challenges," such as using it to ask whether machine learning can outperform radiologists in reading mammograms. For this work, Friend was awarded the designation of an Obama White House Champion of Change 2013. He was noted for using large datasets and integrative system biology approaches to address complex diseases in the mid-1990s, and for having taken his efforts from medicine to academia to biotechnology to big pharmaceutical companies. Friend was recognized during this time when he was the President of Sage Bionetworks.

== Contributions to medicine and biology ==
While at MIT, Friend and his team helped clone the first human cancer susceptibility gene, which blocks human tumor formation. The discovery of the retinoblastoma gene led to a fundamental change in understanding cancer genetics, introducing the concept of tumor suppressor genes. Later, when on the Faculty at Harvard Medical School, the Dana Farber Cancer Institute, and Massachusetts General Hospital, the Friend lab went on to identify that p53 mutations were driving the risk for tumors in Li–Fraumeni syndrome.

Friend has coordinated teams to link clinicians and molecular biologists to clone the first cancer susceptibility gene; yeast geneticists and oncologists to decode cancer cell sensitivities; and, most recently, clinical teams and app developers at Apple to design the first ResearchKit apps.

In 2024, Friend co-authored Key Issues as Wearable Digital Health Technologies Enter Clinical Care, a review examining the growing use of wearable health technologies to improve patient care, while also addressing challenges like privacy, data use, and health equity.

== Recognition ==
Friend was named an Ashoka Fellow by Ashoka: Innovators for the Public in 2011.

== Selected bibliography ==
- Bartz, S. R.; Zhang, Z; Burchard, J; Imakura, M; Martin, M; Palmieri, A; Needham, R; Guo, J; Gordon, M; Chung, N; Warrener, P; Jackson, A. L.; Carleton, M; Oatley, M; Locco, L; Santini, F; Smith, T; Kunapuli, P; Ferrer, M; Strulovici, B; Friend, S. H.; Linsley, P. S. (2006). "Small interfering RNA screens reveal enhanced cisplatin cytotoxicity in tumor cells having both BRCA network and TP53 disruptions". Molecular and Cellular Biology. 26 (24): 9377–86. doi:10.1128/MCB.01229-06. PMC 1698535. PMID 17000754.
- Ginsburg, Geoffrey S.; Picard, Rosalind W.; Friend, Stephen H. (2024-03-21). "Key Issues as Wearable Digital Health Technologies Enter Clinical Care". New England Journal of Medicine. 390 (12): 1118–1127. doi:10.1056/NEJMra2307160. ISSN 0028-4793. PMID 38507754.
- Radich, J. P.; Dai, H; Mao, M; Oehler, V; Schelter, J; Druker, B; Sawyers, C; Shah, N; Stock, W; Willman, C. L.; Friend, S; Linsley, P. S. (2006). "Gene expression changes associated with progression and response in chronic myeloid leukemia". Proceedings of the National Academy of Sciences. 103 (8): 2794–9. Bibcode:2006PNAS..103.2794R. doi:10.1073/pnas.0510423103. PMC 1413797. PMID 16477019.
- Dai, H; Van't Veer, L; Lamb, J; He, Y. D.; Mao, M; Fine, B. M.; Bernards, R; Van De Vijver, M; Deutsch, P; Sachs, A; Stoughton, R; Friend, S (2005). "A cell proliferation signature is a marker of extremely poor outcome in a subpopulation of breast cancer patients". Cancer Research. 65 (10): 4059–66. doi:10.1158/0008-5472.CAN-04-3953. PMID 15899795.
- Lampe, J. W.; Stepaniants, S. B.; Mao, M; Radich, J. P.; Dai, H; Linsley, P. S.; Friend, S. H.; Potter, J. D. (2004). "Signatures of environmental exposures using peripheral leukocyte gene expression: Tobacco smoke". Cancer Epidemiology, Biomarkers & Prevention. 13 (3): 445–53. doi:10.1158/1055-9965.445.13.3. PMID 15006922. S2CID 7624677.
- Van 't Veer, L. J.; Dai, H; Van De Vijver, M. J.; He, Y. D.; Hart, A. A.; Bernards, R; Friend, S. H. (2003). "Expression profiling predicts outcome in breast cancer". Breast Cancer Research. 5 (1): 57–8. doi:10.1186/bcr562. PMC 154139. PMID 12559048.
- Van De Vijver, M. J.; He, Y. D.; Van't Veer, L. J.; Dai, H; Hart, A. A.; Voskuil, D. W.; Schreiber, G. J.; Peterse, J. L.; Roberts, C; Marton, M. J.; Parrish, M; Atsma, D; Witteveen, A; Glas, A; Delahaye, L; Van Der Velde, T; Bartelink, H; Rodenhuis, S; Rutgers, E. T.; Friend, S. H.; Bernards, R (2002). "A gene-expression signature as a predictor of survival in breast cancer". New England Journal of Medicine. 347 (25): 1999–2009. doi:10.1056/NEJMoa021967. hdl:1874/15577. PMID 12490681.
- Lamb, J. R.; Zhang, C; Xie, T; Wang, K; Zhang, B; Hao, K; Chudin, E; Fraser, H. B.; Millstein, J; Ferguson, M; Suver, C; Ivanovska, I; Scott, M; Philippar, U; Bansal, D; Zhang, Z; Burchard, J; Smith, R; Greenawalt, D; Cleary, M; Derry, J; Loboda, A; Watters, J; Poon, R. T.; Fan, S. T.; Yeung, C; Lee, N. P.; Guinney, J; Molony, C; et al. (2011). "Predictive genes in adjacent normal tissue are preferentially altered by sCNV during tumorigenesis in liver cancer and may rate limiting". PLOS ONE. 6 (7) e20090. Bibcode:2011PLoSO...620090L. doi:10.1371/journal.pone.0020090. PMC 3130029. PMID 21750698.
- Mihich, E; Feunteun, J; Friend, S (2002). "Thirteenth annual pezcoller symposium: Focusing analytical tools on complexity in cancer". Cancer Research. 62 (13): 3883–7. PMID 12097304.
- Ginsburg GS, Picard RW, Friend SH (March 2024). "Key Issues as Wearable Digital Health Technologies Enter Clinical Care". N Engl J Med. 390 (12): 1118–1127. doi:10.1056/NEJMra2307160. PMID 38507754.
