= Ralph L. Brinster =

American geneticist

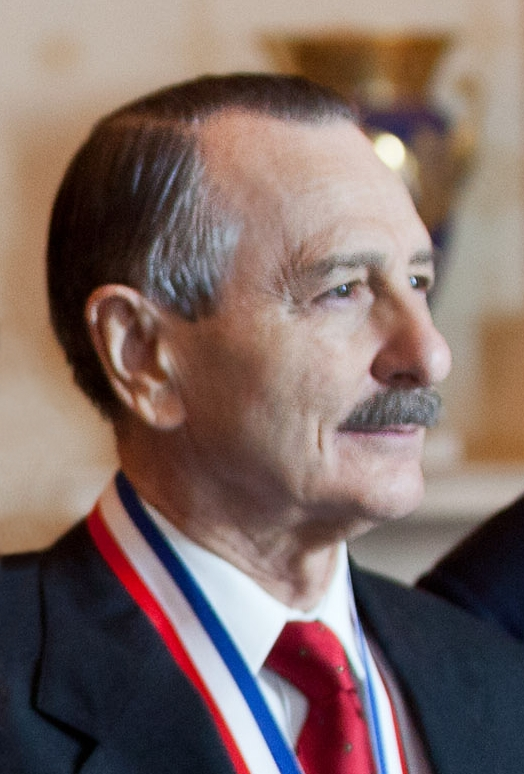
- Brinster in October 2011
- Born: March 10, 1932 (age 94); Montclair, New Jersey, U.S.
- Education: Rutgers University (B.S., 1953); University of Pennsylvania (V.M.D., 1960) (Ph.D., 1964)
- Awards: Grand Prix Charles-Leopold Mayer, FRA; March of Dimes Prize in Developmental Biology, USA; Wolf Prize in Medicine, ISR; Gairdner Foundation International Award, CAN; National Medal of Science, USA
- Scientific career
- Fields: Genetics; Embryology; Genetic engineering
- Workplaces: University of Pennsylvania School of Veterinary Medicine

Ralph Lawrence Brinster (born March 10, 1932) is an American geneticist, National Medal of Science laureate, and Richard King Mellon Professor of Reproductive Physiology at the School of Veterinary Medicine, University of Pennsylvania.

== Early life and education ==
Brinster grew up on a small farm in Cedar Grove, New Jersey, where his parents raised purebred animals. He studied animal science as an undergraduate at the Cook School of Agriculture, Rutgers University, New Brunswick, NJ and completed his B.S. in 1953. While he was in college, the Korean Conflict began, and he volunteered for service. He was a USAF second lieutenant in Korea during the last year of the combat period and after being assigned to the U.S. Army was stationed north of Seoul with an Army Battalion. He returned from military service and earned his V.M.D. (Veterinariae Medicinae Doctoris) (1960) and his Ph.D. in Physiology (1964) from the University of Pennsylvania.

== Research impact ==
Ralph Brinster is acknowledged as one of the seminal founders of the field of mammalian transgenesis. He is known throughout the scientific community for his revolutionary research in early embryo development, embryonic-cell differentiation, mechanisms of gene control, and stem cell biology. . In 2006, Brinster received a Canada Gairdner Foundation International Award for pioneering discoveries in germline modification in mammals. In part the citation read, "his range of contributions is unmatched in the field". Germline cells are at the foundation of species continuity and are responsible for propagation of individuals of varying genetic content that is critical for evolutionary competition. Specifically, the genetic composition of these cells is the essence of their importance. Brinster's seminal studies on mammalian egg manipulation strategies and his pioneering research on spermatogonial stem cells are today the foundation for all studies in this field, including the controversial potential for modifying the human germline.

Some have suggested that "the experimental genetic manipulation of the animal germline initially by pronuclear injection of cloned DNA into zygotes represents one of the most significant milestones in the history of human civilization," Behringer et al, in Manipulating the Mouse Embryo (Cold Spring Harbor Laboratory Press, pg14, 2014). Germline modification has existed for hundreds of millions of years and has contributed to the evolution of species through interaction with their environment. Purposeful germline modification by man began about 10,000 years ago in the fertile crescent of southwest Asia with domestication of plants and animals, giving rise to agriculture and modern civilization. The initial concept of domesticating wild species may be viewed as the first of four critical advances in man's intervention in evolutionary germline modification and is considered by many as representing the beginning of modern human history. The subsequent realization that selecting and breeding desirable phenotypes would lead to valuable alterations in domesticated species symbolizes the second advance. The identification and characterization of hereditary elements, which began with the studies of Mendel and continues today with the sequencing of genomes, represents the third significant development. These three conceptual advances are often considered to be the foundation of agriculture and modern civilization. Experimental addition or modification of individual DNA sequences and genes in the germline, known as transgenesis, exemplifies a fourth unique conceptual advance in man's purposeful modification of the germline. Thus, the generation of transgenic animals is an extraordinary, creative development in man's historical interaction with other species and of enormous importance in biology and medicine (see NICHD 2003 Hall of Honor and 2012 Colloquium External links below).

During the 1960s, Brinster pioneered the development of techniques to manipulate mouse embryos, and his techniques have made the mouse the major genetic model for understanding the basis of human biology and disease. His research has provided the experimental foundation for progress in germline genetic modification in a range of species, which has generated a revolution in biology, medicine, and agriculture.

In July 2024, Dr. Brinster had 411 total publications, approximately 322 are in peer-reviewed journals and 89 are chapters/reviews. Included in the publications are: 30 in Nature, 18 in Cell, 13 in Science, and 35 in Proc. Natl. Acad. Sci.

His research contribution/impact is ranked 1st of 173,000 contributors in Veterinary Medicine in the world and 8th of one million contributors in Agriculture and Natural Resources in the world in Scholars GPS with an h-index = 153.

He is ranked #128 in the world and # 96 in the United States among top scientists for 2024 in Research.com with a D-index (Discipline h-index) = 152.

== Research history ==
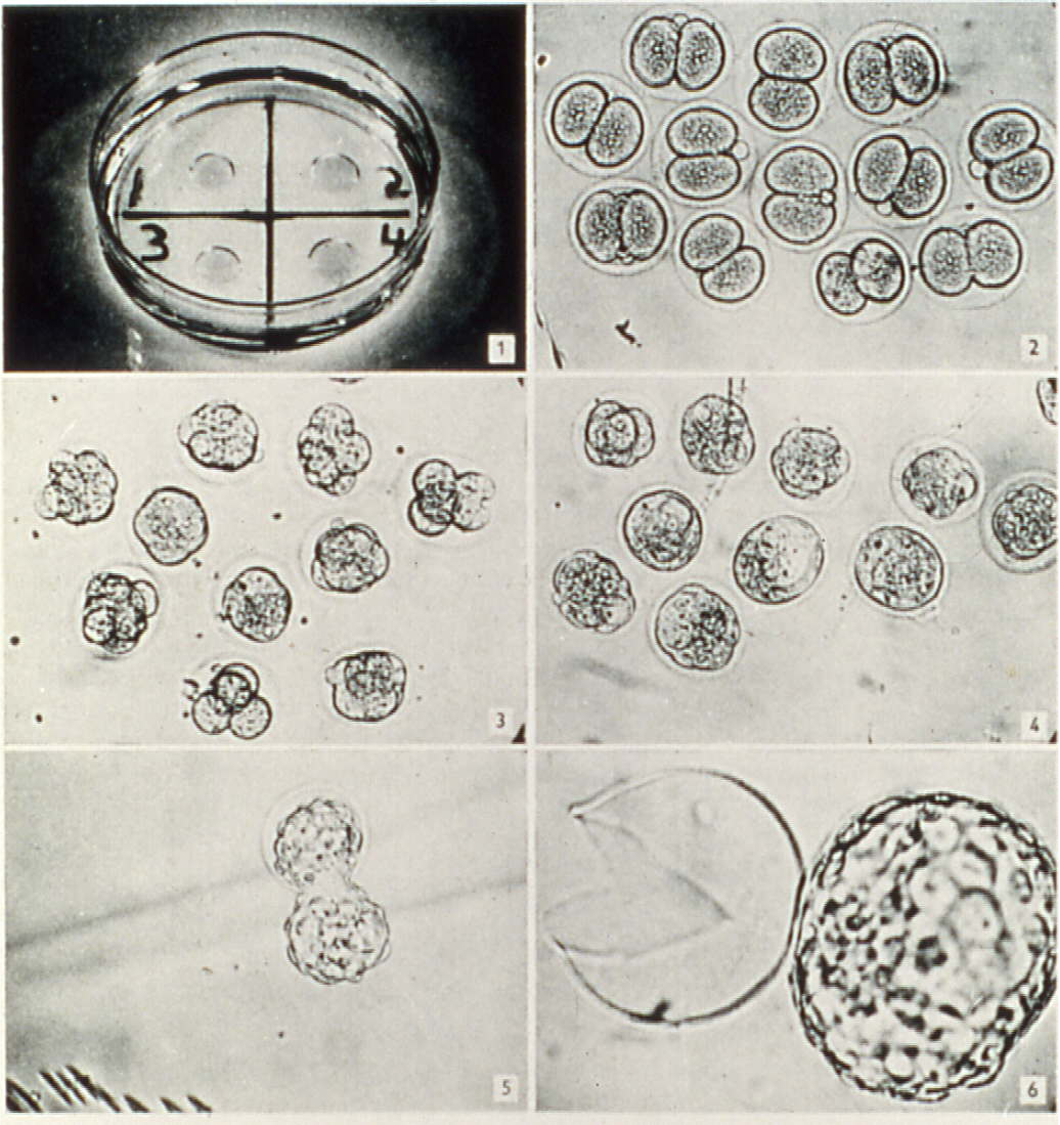
Fig. 1. Mouse egg culture. The image shows the dish in which embryos are cultured and the progression of two-cell embryos to a hollow structure known as the blastocyst.

=== Culture of mammalian eggs and embryos ===
While a Ph.D. candidate in the 1960s, Brinster developed the first reliable in vitro culture system for early mammalian embryos. His initial studies were on fertilized eggs of the mouse. In 1963, he described a culture method consisting of micro drops of medium under oil, which remains the primary culture technique for mammalian eggs of all species, including human eggs during in vitro fertilization. During the next 10 years, Brinster studied many aspects of mouse egg metabolism and defined characteristics common to eggs of all mammalian species. From these studies he developed a culture medium and embryo manipulation strategies that are the basis of all egg culture media and manipulation methods in use today. He published more than 60 papers in the general area of egg metabolism and culture and is the scientist who laid the foundation for subsequent research involving mammalian egg culture. His studies provided a reliable method to manipulate all stages of preimplantation development in the mouse and other mammalian species (See Figure 1).

These techniques have been conserved to the present day and form the foundation for all experimentation with the mammalian embryo - including transgenic animals, embryonic stem cell research, human and mammalian in vitro fertilization, mammalian cloning, and knockout technology.

His in vitro culture and egg manipulation strategies have directly enabled foundational techniques in modern science such as embryo splitting, intracytoplasmic sperm injection, nuclear transplantation, and mitochondrial transplantation into eggs, among others, which occur in vitro using methods virtually unchanged since they were introduced by Brinster.

This "Brinster Method" of embryo manipulation is so ubiquitous in modern biology that other scientists rarely cite the work in current publications.

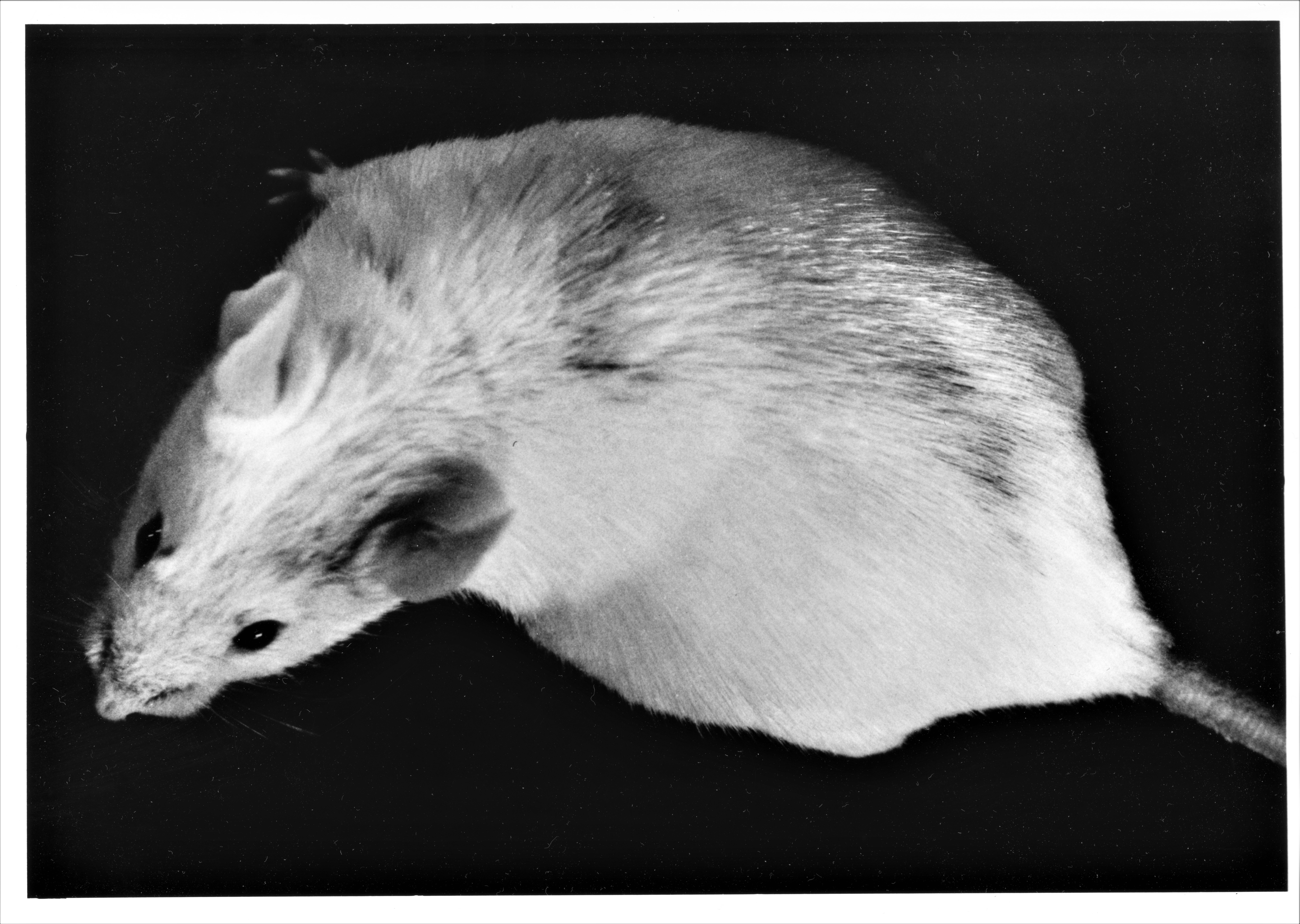
Fig. 2. Chimeric mouse. This mouse resulted from a blastocyst, which normally would produce a white mouse, that was injected with teratocarcinoma cells from a brown mouse. The dark stripes on the mouse represent the contribution of the foreign brown-type cells.

=== Stem cells injection into mouse embryos produce the first prototype transgenic animal ===
Brinster used the foundation of his culture and manipulation strategies to study techniques to alter the genetic makeup of developing embryos and their germ cells. In the early 1970s, he injected stem cells into embryos (blastocysts) in a series of imaginative experiments which were of enormous importance and changed the way scientists thought about the possibility of modifying genes in the germline. He was the first scientist to demonstrate that foreign teratocarcinoma cells could combine with native blastocyst cells to form adult "chimeric" mice, demonstrating the feasibility of this novel approach to change the genetic character of mice (Fig. 2). The introduction of foreign cells and new genes into these chimeric mice generated the first prototype transgenic animals. In addition, this discovery stimulated the search for embryonic stem cells and ultimately led to the development of the "knock-out mouse".

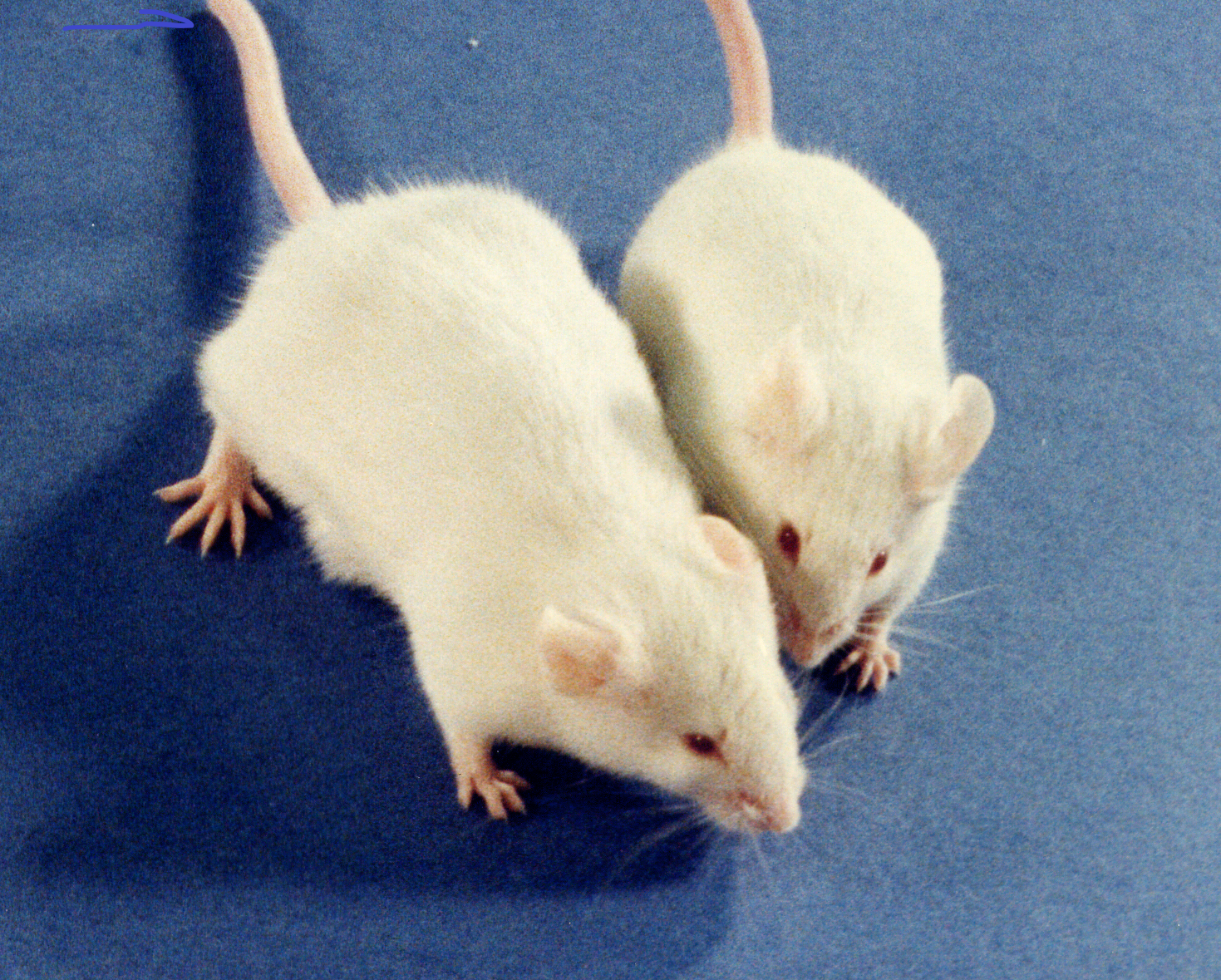
Fig. 4. Giant/Super Mouse produced from growth hormone gene injection into mouse egg. The small mouse is of normal size, and the large mouse resulted from a fertilized egg injected with a growth hormone gene, as shown in figure 3 above. The injected egg was transferred to a foster mother uterus and subsequently produced the large mouse which grew twice as fast and became 50% larger.

=== Transgenesis and the giant mouse ===
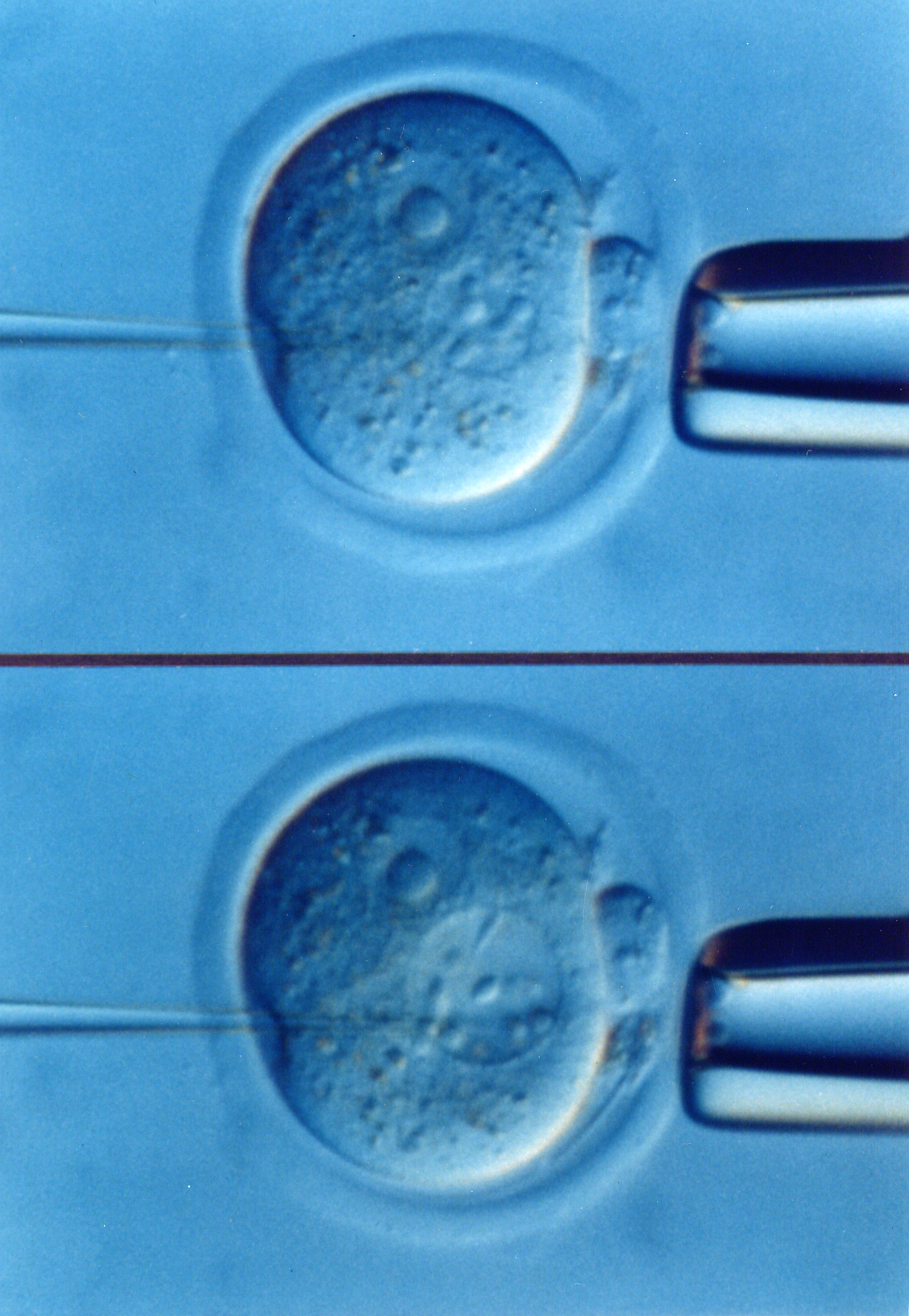
Fig. 3. New gene being injected into fertilized mouse egg. The top image is a fertilized mouse egg before injection, and the bottom image is the egg following introduction of a solution containing a new gene (note the swollen pro-nuclear structure in the lower egg, which contains the chromosomes of the egg and the new gene).

Professor Brinster was the first scientist to microinject fertilized eggs with RNA and DNA, and was at the forefront of the field in applying these microinjection methods to generate transgenic mice. Direct injection of fertilized mouse eggs, pioneered by Brinster, was the first approach to achieve routine experimental germline modification and served as the basis for all subsequent techniques (Fig. 3).

Brinster then collaborated with Richard Palmiter, a prominent molecular biologist at the University of Washington, to pioneer and develop the transfer of foreign genes into mammals, and they utilized these methods to elucidate the activity and function of many genes. Their seminal experiments catalyzed a worldwide revolution in genetic engineering in the 1980s. Transgenic mice are now used every day in thousands of laboratories around the world to investigate everything from cancer biology and cardiovascular disease to hair loss and abnormal behavior. Their experiments, for the first time, showed that new genes could be introduced into the mammalian germline with the potential to increase disease resistance, enhance growth, and produce vital proteins like blood-clotting factors needed by hemophiliacs. Perhaps their best known experiment was in generating the "Giant/Super Mouse", which catalyzed interest within the scientific community and in the general public about the enormous potential of the transgenic technology being developed and is credited with the initiation of the genetic revolution in biology, medicine and agriculture (Fig. 4). In addition, they provided the first proof of expression of transgenes, the first example of cancer arising from a transgene and the first proof of the targeted integration of DNA by egg injection. Together, Brinster and Palmiter developed many of the first animal models of human disease throughout the 1980s. Their partnership also yielded the first transgenic rabbits, sheep, and pigs.

This transcontinental collaboration constructed a body of work that formed the foundation for a generation of scientific progress in genetic modification via transgenesis, homologous recombination or "knock-out" techniques, and cloning; and the egg culture and manipulation strategies were essential for these experiments by Brinster and Palmiter, as well as for all other scientists working with eggs and embryos of all species. The egg culture and injection techniques developed by Brinster serve as the basis for the CRISPR/Cas9 system of genetic modification currently used for all types of gene changes in all species.

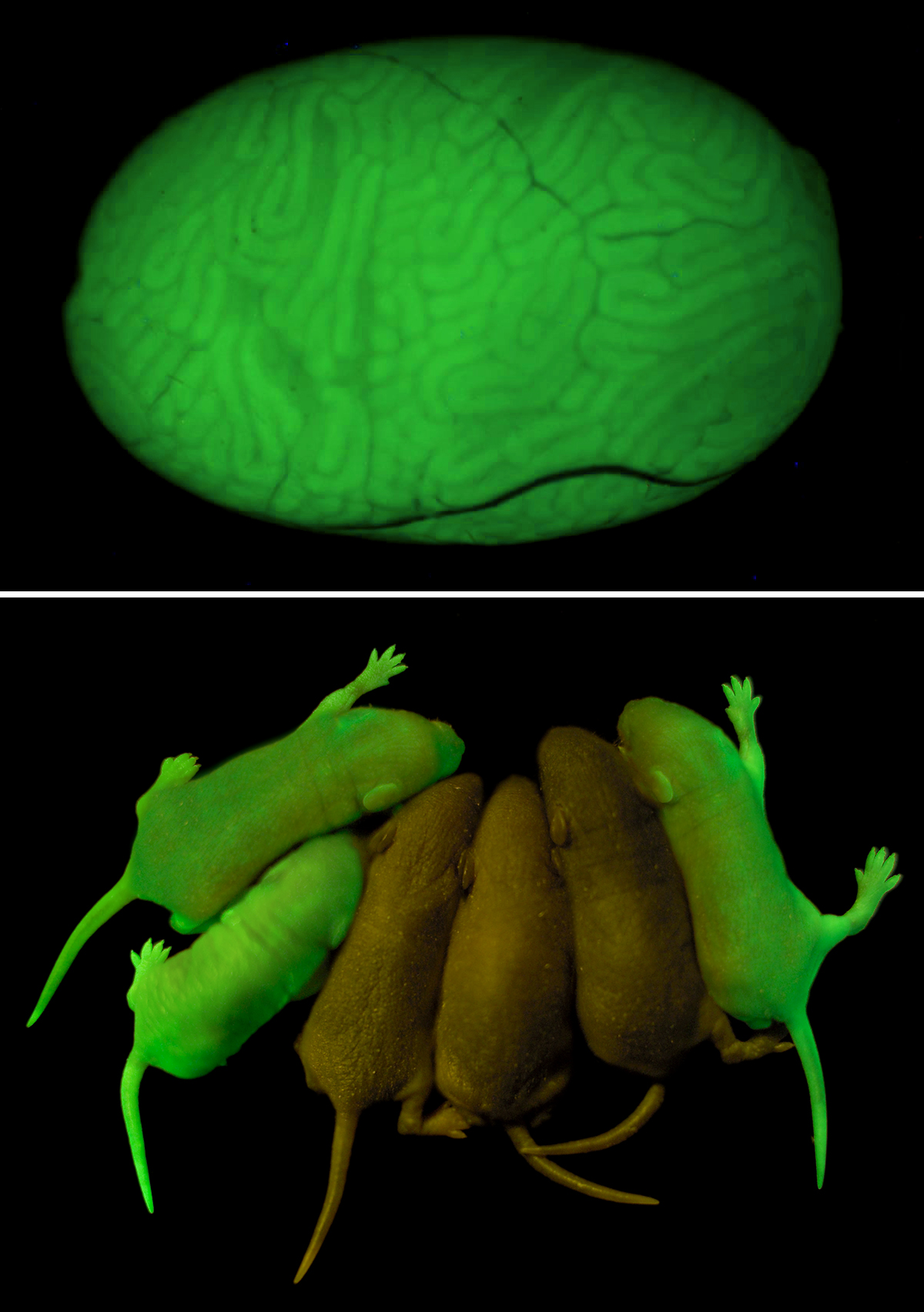
Fig. 5. Top panel. Recipient mouse testis that was injected with genetically modified spermatogonial stem cells containing a reporter transgene for Green Fluorescent Protein (GFP), which will fluoresce green. Bottom Panel. The testis will produce spermatozoa that transmitted the GFP transgene to offspring.

In short, Brinster's egg injection technique was the first used to produce transgenic animals and is now the major method for making all genetic alterations in all species.

=== Modifying genes in sperm ===
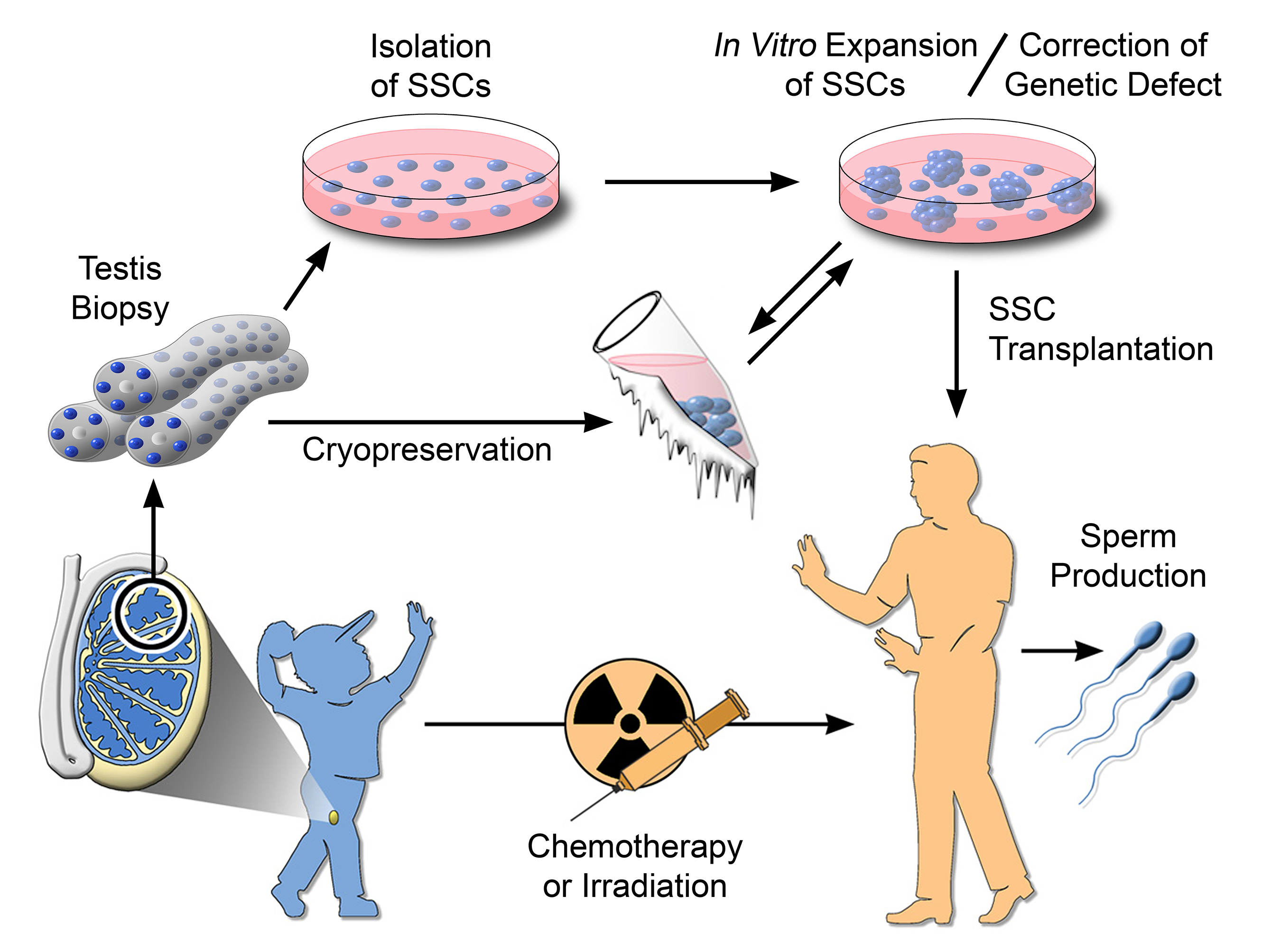
Fig. 6. Male germline stem cell transplantation. The proposed clinical application of human spermatogonial stem cells (SSCs). Before treatment for cancer by chemotherapy or irradiation, a prepubertal boy could undergo a testicular biopsy to recover SSCs. The SSCs would be cryopreserved and/or cultured to expand their number in vitro. After treatment, the SSCs would be transplanted to the patient's testes to produce spermatozoa. A step for genetic correction to rescue a genetic disorder is possible prior to transplantation.

In recent years, Brinster has continued to advance the field of stem cell biology by making a series of catalyzing, transformational discoveries utilizing male germline stem cells, called spermatogonial stem cells (SSCs). Spermatogonial stem cells in the testes are the only cells in the adult body that divide throughout life and transmit genes to the next generation, establishing them as a powerful resource to modify genes of any mammalian species. In elegant experiments published in 1994, Brinster demonstrated that these stem cells can be transplanted from the testis of a fertile male to the testis of an infertile male where they establish spermatogenesis and produce spermatozoa of donor haplotype (Fig. 5). He further demonstrated that the technique is applicable to all mammalian species examined, including humans. Currently, scientists are extending spermatogonial stem cell culture and transplantation to prepubertal boys being treated for cancer to preserve their fertility (Fig. 6). The ability to harvest, culture, genetically modify, freeze and transplant spermatogonial stem cells will not only allow sophisticated genetic modification but could make individual males biologically immortal. Unfortunately, and contrary to general belief, recent studies have shown that long-term cryopreservation in liquid nitrogen (-196 Celsius) of SSCs does not preserve genetic fidelity. These changes in the stem cell genetic program resulting from cryopreservation must be identified and corrected to restore the original genetic program of the stem cell before clinical application. However, a solution could be to convert a somatic cell to a germ cell, particularly to the SSC, which may have fewer perturbations of the original stem cell genotype and would have enormous implications scientifically and in the treatment of clinically important fertility problems.

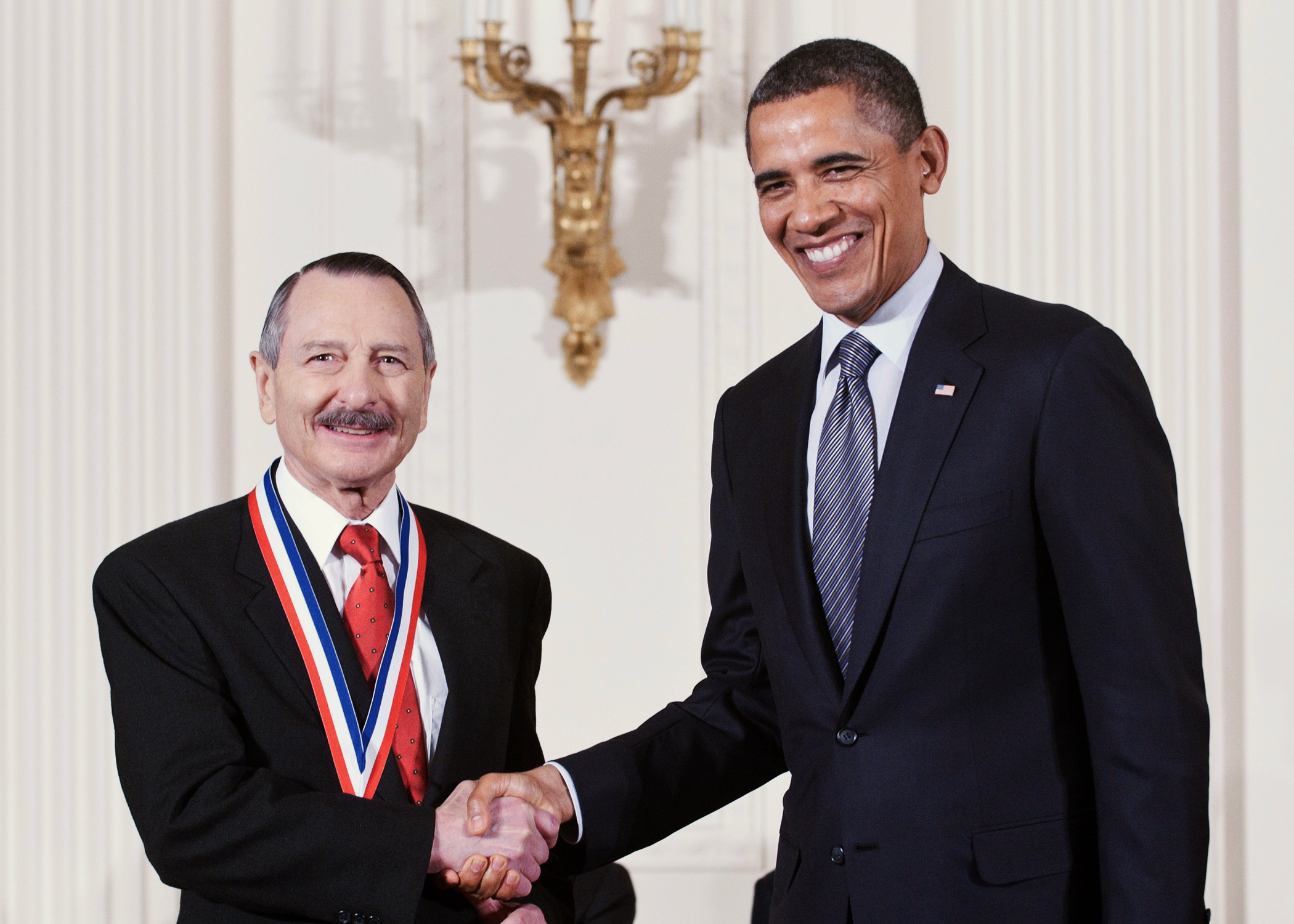
Professor Ralph Brinster receiving the National Medal of Science from President Barack Obama.

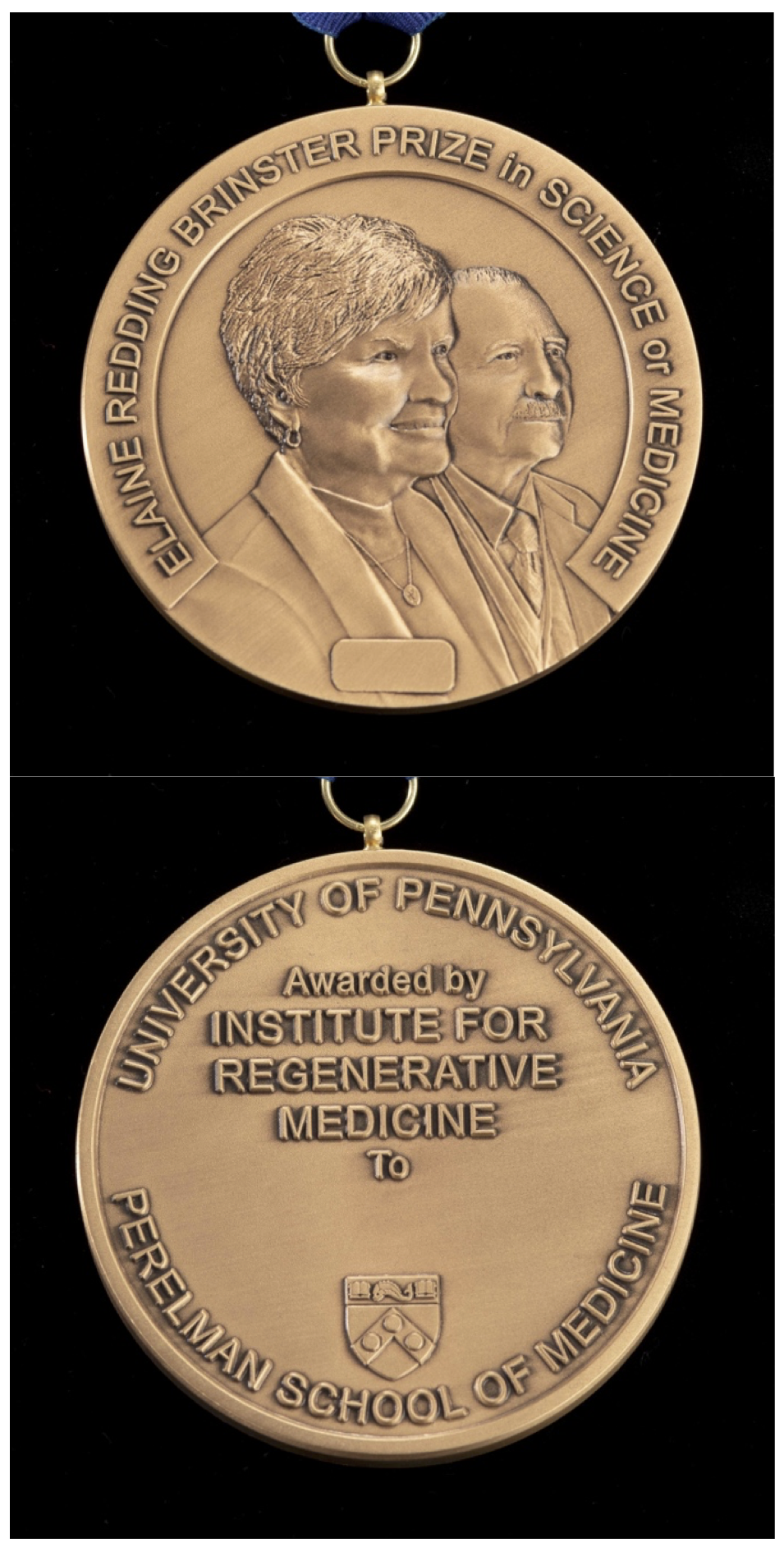
The Elaine Redding Brinster Prize in Science or Medicine medallion.

== Major scientific recognition ==
In 2003, Brinster was awarded the Wolf Prize in Medicine and was cited for "development of procedures to manipulate mouse ova and embryos, which has enabled transgenesis and its applications in mice. The first scientist to microinject fertilized eggs (with RNA), Brinster was at the forefront of applying these methods to generate transgenic mice". Importantly, the first transgenics of any species were made by direct injection of genes into mouse eggs, which has been the major method to generate transgenic animals since it was described. Moreover, the development of the CRISPR/Cas9 approach has now made direct egg injection the choice for germline modification in almost all circumstances and in all species. In 2006, Brinster received a Canada Gairdner Foundation International Award for pioneering discoveries in germline modification in mammals. In part the citation read, "his range of contributions is unmatched in the field". Most recently, Brinster was awarded the 2010 National Medal of Science, the highest accolade bestowed by the United States government on scientists and engineers, from President Barack Obama for his seminal contributions to germline genetic modification. Since the award was established in 1962, Brinster was the first veterinarian in the United States and the eighth scientist from the University of Pennsylvania to win the National Medal of Science.

== Academic career ==
Brinster has spent his entire academic career at the University of Pennsylvania School of Veterinary Medicine; from 1956 to 1960 as a veterinary student, from 1960 to 1964 as a postdoctoral fellow and PhD Candidate, and then continuing as a faculty member. He was appointed associate professor in 1966, professor in 1970, and the Richard King Mellon Professor of Reproductive Physiology in 1975, a position he still holds. In 1969 he founded the Veterinary Medical Scientist Training Program, the first and only combined VMD (DVM)/PhD program funded by the National Institutes of Health, serving as its Director until 1984. Since 1969 the Program has trained more than 100 combined degree graduates that serve in many senior positions throughout the country. From 1997 to 2007, he was Scientific Director of the Center for Animal Transgenesis and Germ Cell Research at the School of Veterinary Medicine. From 2007 to 2008, he was Founding Co-Director of the Institute for Regenerative Medicine of the University of Pennsylvania, one of the leading programs in the world. He trained more than 50 pre-doctoral and postdoctoral fellows in his laboratory and taught physiology to professional students in the School of Veterinary Medicine every year from 1964 to 2020. In 2020, the Ralph L. Brinster President's Distinguished Professorship was established by the University of Pennsylvania to recognize the outstanding scientific contributions of Brinster.

== Personal history ==
In 1961, Brinster married Elaine Redding, a registered nurse and graduate of the Philadelphia General Hospital School of Nursing, and they currently reside in Gladwyne, PA. They have four children. Lauren R. Brinster earned her VMD from the School of Veterinary Medicine at the University of Pennsylvania. She is a veterinary pathologist at the National Institutes of Health, Bethesda, MD. Kristen A. Brinster earned her Juris Doctor from the University of Baltimore School of Law. She is a trial lawyer and the founding managing partner of Sutherland & Brinster, PA in Maryland. Derek R. Brinster earned his MD from the Perelman School of Medicine at the University of Pennsylvania. He is a Professor of Cardiovascular and Thoracic Surgery and Director of Aortic Surgery at Northwell Health, New York, NY. Clayton J. Brinster earned an MD from the Perelman School of Medicine at the University of Pennsylvania. He is an Associate Professor of Surgery and Director, Center for Genetic Aortopathy and Related Disorders at Keck Medicine of the University of Southern California. In 2021, the Elaine Redding Brinster Prize in Science or Medicine was established by the children to recognize the enormous contribution of Elaine to the achievements of the family. The $250,000 Prize and Medallion are to be awarded annually to an outstanding scientist from any country by the Institute for Regenerative Medicine of the University of Pennsylvania during the Annual Ralph L. Brinster Symposium.

== Awards and honors ==
- 1960–1961 American Veterinary Medical Association Fellow University of Pennsylvania, Graduate School of Arts & Sciences
- 1961–1964 Pennsylvania Plan Scholar University of Pennsylvania, Graduate School of Arts & Sciences
- 1983 Award in Biological and Medical Sciences New York Academy of Sciences
- 1984 Harvey Society Lecturer
- 1986 Fellow of the American Academy of Arts and Sciences
- 1986 Member of the Institute of Medicine National Academy of Sciences
- 1987 Honored by an International Symposium W. Alton Jones Cell Science Center
- 1987 Member of the National Academy of Sciences
- 1989 Fellow of the American Association for the Advancement of Science
- 1989 Distinguished Service Award U.S. Department of Agriculture
- 1991 Nobel Symposium Invited Lecturer, Stockholm, Sweden
- 1992 Fellow American Academy of Microbiology
- 1992 Fundación Juan March Lecture Madrid, Spain
- 1992 Pioneer Award of the International Embryo Transfer Society
- 1994 Grand Prix Charles-Leopold Mayer highest honor of the French Academy of Sciences (with Richard Palmiter)
- 1994 Doctor Honoris Causa in Medicine University of the Basque Country, Spain
- 1995 Alumni Award of Merit University of Pennsylvania, School of Veterinary Medicine
- 1996 March of Dimes Prize in Developmental Biology with Beatrice Mintz (inaugural year)
- 1997 Bower Award and Prize for Achievement in Science Franklin Institute
- 1997 Carl Hartman Award of the Society for the Study of Reproduction
- 1997 John Scott Medal for Scientific Achievement City Trusts of Philadelphia
- 1998 Honored by a Special Festschrift Issue, dedicated to Dr. Brinster and the worldwide impact of his contributions; International Journal of Developmental Biology
- 1998 Pioneer in Reproduction Research Award National Institute of Child Health & Human Development
- 1999 George Hammel Cook Distinguished Alumni Award Rutgers, The State University of New Jersey
- 2000 Charlton Lecture Tufts University School of Medicine
- 2000 Honorary Doctor of Science Degree from Rutgers, The State University of New Jersey
- 2001 Ernst W. Bertner Award University of Texas M.D. Anderson Cancer Center, in recognition of pioneering contributions to cancer research.
- 2002 Highly Cited Researcher (1980-2000), Designated by the Institute for Scientific Information. About 1 in 1000 authors are in this category.
- 2003 Wolf Prize in Medicine, Israel "for the development of procedures to manipulate mouse ova and embryos, which has enabled transgenesis and its applications in mice". with Mario Capecchi and Oliver Smithies
- 2003 Selected for the Hall of Honor National Institute of Child Health and Human Development (15 members, total)
- 2006 Gairdner Foundation International Award, Canada "for pioneering discoveries in germ line modification in mammals."
- 2010 National Medal of Science, United States "for fundamental contributions to the development and use of transgenic mice."
- 2011 International Society for Transgenic Technologies Award Lifetime Achievement Award.
- 2012 Lifetime Achievement Award. From the Alumni of the University of Pennsylvania School of Veterinary Medicine.
- 2012 Career Excellence in Theriogenology Award. From the Theriogenology Foundation on behalf of the American College of Theriogenologists and the Society for Theriogenology.
- 2015 Honorary Doctor of Laws, University of Calgary, Canada.
- 2015 Fellow of the American Physiological Society.
- 2017 Ralph L. Brinster President's Distinguished Professorship, University of Pennsylvania.
- 2019 Frontiers of Germ Cell Research. Brinster Spermatogonial Stem Cell Transplantation 25th Anniversary Symposium, University of Pennsylvania School of Veterinary Medicine.
- 2026 Ranked No. 85 on the Forbes 250 list of America's most successful living military veterans who made significant contributions following their military service.

== In popular culture ==
The widely acclaimed Zadie Smith novel "White Teeth" features prominently a genetically modified mouse "Futuremouse", based loosely on the transgenic experiments of Palmiter and Brinster in the 1980s.

In 2017, Dr. Brinster was depicted in his laboratory by portrait artist Mary Whyte. Mary Whyte was recently presented the Portrait Society of America Gold Medal in honor of "a lifelong dedication to excellence, as well as in recognition of a distinguished body of work that serves to foster and enhance fine art portraiture and figurative works in America."
