= Richard Palmiter =

Richard Palmiter (born April 5, 1942) is a cellular biologist. He was born in Poughkeepsie, NY, and later went on to earn a BA in Zoology from Duke University and a PhD in Biological Sciences from Stanford University. He is employed with the University of Washington where he is a professor of biochemistry and genome sciences. His current research involves developing a deeper understanding of Parkinson's disease. His most notable research is a collaboration with Dr. Ralph Brinster where they injected purified DNA into a single-cell mouse embryo, showing transmission of the genetic material to subsequent generations for the first time.

== Background and education ==
Richard Palmiter was born in Poughkeepsie, NY, on April 5, 1942. He earned his Bachelor of Arts in zoology at Duke University in 1964 followed by a PhD in Biological Sciences from Stanford University in 1968. He has been employed with the University of Washington since 1974. He was appointed as Investigator of the Howard Hughes Medical Institute two years later in 1976. His research is notable in the cell biology community which is evidenced by his funding by the National Institutes of Health and The Michael J. Fox Foundation. He has been a contributing member to the prestigious National Academy of Sciences since 1984. Due to his background education and passions, his work primarily centers on molecular biology and animal physiology. In addition to his research, he is a professor of biochemistry at the University of Washington.

== Work and discoveries ==
=== Regulation of egg white production in laying hens ===
Palmiter's research career began with the role of sex steroids and the regulation of the transcription of genes responsible for egg white production in laying hens. This research surrounding the regulation of gene transcription led him and his team to focus more specifically on the regulation and function of metallothionein genes: gene products that bind heavy metals and are believed to have a role in metal homeostasis and resistance to metal toxicity and oxidative damage. This research is notable as his group was the first to clone these specific genes and the group has later gone on to dissect the regulatory elements involved in their expression. His background in zoology allowed him to lead his team to generate mice that make excess metallothionein or mice that are unable to make specific metallothionein proteins as a means of exploring the gene function in animals.

=== Transgenic mice ===
Palmiter's most well-known work involves his studies on making transgenic mice. This research was conducted in a 15-year transcontinental collaboration with Ralph L. Brinster at the University of Pennsylvania. These researchers were pioneers in introducing functional genes into the genome of mice, rabbits, sheep, and pigs—these animals with foreign genes inserted into their genomes are labeled transgenic. Palmiter and Brinster created the ‘super mouse.’ This mouse grew larger than normal as a result of adding a hybrid gene to the mouse genome. The mice carried a growth hormone gene that was controlled by the regulatory elements of the aforementioned metallothionein gene. Prior to their work, the term ‘transgenic’ was virtually unheard of; but after their collaboration, the use of the word in scientific papers has skyrocketed.

DNA sequences important for the restriction of gene expression to specific cell types were discovered due to these newly created transgenic mice. These mice were also used for studying cell transformation and cancer. Palmiter's research group also uses gene knockout techniques to inactive genes with the primary responsibility of chemical transmitter synthesis that is vital for studying the nervous system development and function. Their research has concluded that noradrenaline is essential for normal maternal behavior and defense against cold stress: mice that cannot generate neuropeptide Y eat and grow normally but they are alcoholic and have a tendency to have epileptic seizures.

=== Zinc as a chemical transmitter ===
Palmiter and his research group have also investigated the role of zinc as a chemical transmitter in the brain. They have discovered that it prevents excessive excitability of the CNS. Mice that do not make dopamine are found to be hypoactive and have no motivation to eat or drink. Despite their lack of thirst or hunger, these mice can be kept alive with pharmacological delivery of L-DOPA or viral gene therapy with vectors that restore L-DOPA synthesis. The group's recent research has turned to the attempt to enhance understanding of Parkinson's disease. The underlying cause of PD is a gradual loss of neurons that produce dopamine. Palmiter's current ideas suggest that the disruption of mitochondrial function and the accumulation of damaged proteins has the potential to lead to the death of dopaminergic neurons. Their current task is developing models to mimic these cellular processes.

=== Neural circuits underlying innate behavior ===
In the last three decades Palmiter has become interested in the neural circuits that control innate behaviors such as eating and drinking. Palmiter and his team use mouse genetic models and viral gene transfer to study neural circuits in specific brain regions. Their goals are to visualize where relevant neurons are located and where they project their axons, to record the neurons’ activity in real time, and to evaluate the behavioral and physiological consequences of activating or inhibiting those neurons. They also aim to identify downstream targets of certain neurons and discern how they are involved in responding to various threats, including pain, itch, and food poisoning.

== Honors and scientific legacy ==
Palmiter's valuable research has contributed greatly to the molecular biology field; therefore, he has received numerous awards and accolades as well as given lectures at notable conferences throughout his career. His lectures include the Vern Chapman lecture in 2004 at the 18th International Mouse Genome Meeting as well as the Wallace Rowe lecture in 1999 at the American Association of Laboratory Animal Sciences 50th Annual Meeting. In 1999 he became a Tyner Eminent Scholar at Florida State University, in 1998 he was distinguished as a Second International Fellow of the Garvan Institute in Sydney, Australia, and in 1988 he was elected to both the National Academy of Sciences and the American Academy of Arts and Sciences. His awards include the Julius Axelrod Award in Pharmacology in 2004, (the Charles-Leopold Mayer Award from the French Academy of Sciences in 1994, the Distinguished Service Award from the US Department of Agriculture in 1989, the New York Academy Award in Biological and Medical Sciences in 1983, and the George Thorn Award from the Howard Hughes Medical Institute in 1982.

== Selected publications ==
Below are some of Palmiter's most-cited publications:

- Madisen, Linda; Zwingman, Theresa A.; Sunkin, Susan M.; Oh, Seung Wook; Zariwala, Hatim A.; Gu, Hong; Ng, Lydia L.; Palmiter, Richard D.; Hawrylycz, Michael J.; Jones, Allan R.; Lein, Ed S.; Zeng, Hongkui (2010). "A robust and high-throughput Cre reporting and characterization system for the whole mouse brain". Nature Neuroscience. 13 (1): 133–140. doi:10.1038/nn.2467. PMC 2840225. PMID 20023653.
- Palmiter, Richard D.; Brinster, Ralph L. (1986). "Germ-Line Transformation of Mice". Annual Review of Genetics. 20: 465–499. doi:10.1146/annurev.ge.20.120186.002341. PMC 5553637. PMID 3545063.
- Palmiter, Richard D.; Brinster, Ralph L.; Hammer, Robert E.; Trumbauer, Myrna E.; Rosenfeld, Michael G.; Birnberg, Neal C.; Evans, Ronald M. (1982). "Dramatic growth of mice that develop from eggs microinjected with metallothionein–growth hormone fusion genes". Nature. 300 (5893): 611–615. Bibcode:1982Natur.300..611P. doi:10.1038/300611a0. PMC 4881848. PMID 6958982.
- Brinster, R. L.; Chen, H. Y.; Trumbauer, M. E.; Yagle, M. K.; Palmiter, R. D. (1985). "Factors affecting the efficiency of introducing foreign DNA into mice by microinjecting eggs". Proceedings of the National Academy of Sciences. 82 (13): 4438–4442. Bibcode:1985PNAS...82.4438B. doi:10.1073/pnas.82.13.4438. PMC 391116. PMID 3892534.
