= Mark Levis =

American oncologist

Mark J. Levis is an American physician‑scientist and oncologist whose research focuses on treatment and molecular targeting of acute leukemia. He is a Professor of Oncology at the Johns Hopkins University School of Medicine, Director of the Adult Leukemia Service, and has served as Co‑Director of the Division of Hematologic Malignancies at the Sidney Kimmel Comprehensive Cancer Center. He is the recipient of the Daniel Nathans Research Award from Johns Hopkins University.He is also member of the American Society of Hematology (ASH), and the American Society of Clinical Oncology (ASCO), and the European Hematology Association.

== Education and career ==
He earned a B.A. in Genetics from the University of California, Berkeley in 1984. He completed both his Ph.D. in Biochemistry in 1992 and M.D. in 1994 at the UCSF School of Medicine.

Levis joined the Johns Hopkins faculty in 2002. He became full professor of Oncology in 2015. He served as the co-leader of the Hematologic Malignancies and Bone Marrow Transplantation Program at the Sidney Kimmel Comprehensive Cancer Center until 2025.

== Research ==
His research focuses on targeted therapies for leukemia, with a focus on FLT3 (FMS‑like tyrosine kinase 3) as a therapeutic target in AML. .

Levis research also focuses on FLT3 inhibitors, including the clinical development of gilteritinib and quizartinib, both effective FLT3 inhibitors approved for treating FLT3‑mutated AML. He also developed assays to measure plasma inhibitory activity of these drugs and to evaluate their effectiveness as targeted therapies in patients.
