= The Resilience Project =

American study into severe genetic disorders

The Resilience Project is a project, undertaken by the Icahn School of Medicine at Mount Sinai in collaboration with Sage Bionetworks.

== Overview ==
The project seeks to identify protective factors against disease through collaboration with people who have significant risk factors for disease that nevertheless do not manifest typical signs and symptoms. In a pilot study, big data was used to identify individuals with apparent resistance to severe genetic disease.

This approach may seem weird, since the gene that is known to cause a genetic disorder could also be dealt with (head on) by just using overwriting the genetic code of this faulty gene with "good code" using gene therapy.

However, there is never just one version of "good code" (even people that do not have a disorder, the gene that is otherwise known to cause the defect can be present with different code). So rather than having to deal with these problems, Stephen Friend decided to use a workaround method (which consists of the approach noted above).

== Diseases ==
Initially, the diseases the project looked at were 170 severe, Mendelian, disorders. However, the genetic data gathered from 600,000 people was not enough (Note: These 600,000 people were not people known to have one of the 170 diseases mentioned. Rather they were everyday people that in some cases carried a gene known to cause a disease, but didn't know they carried it themselves.)(only resilient individuals of 8 of the targeted diseases were found). The list of diseases it know look at is the following:

- Cystic fibrosis
- Smith–Lemli–Opitz syndrome
- Familial dysautonomia
- Epidermolysis Bullosa simplex
- Pfeiffer syndrome
- Autoimmune polyendocrine syndrome type 1 (APECED)
- Acampomelic campomelic dysplasia
- Atelosteogenesis

== Data ==
DNA sequences from 589,306 people were used, obtained from 23andMe, Beijing Genomics Institute, Broad Institute and others.

== Criticism ==
Critics have argued that the researchers could not contact any of people to positively ensure that they were indeed healthy, despite having the disease mutation. Human geneticist Daniel MacArthur of the Centre for Population Genomics (then working at the Broad Institute in Cambridge, Massachusetts) still regards the study as “important as a proof-of-principle”.

In response to this criticism, Friend and Schadt have modified their Resilience Project by inviting new volunteers who agree to be recontacted to participate through a website

== Participatory Study ==
In April 2020, the Resilience Project launched a participatory research study open to individuals in the USA.

== Similar projects ==
- The 100000 Genomes Project
- U.S. Precision Medicine Initiative's 1 million person cohort study
