= Icahn Genomics Institute =

Biomedical and genomics research institute in New York, US

- Established: 2011
- Research type: Translational research
- Field of research: gene editing, gene therapy, genomics
- Director: Brian Brown
- Location: 1425 Madison Avenue, New York, NY 10029-6501, New York City
- Affiliations: Icahn School of Medicine at Mount Sinai; Mount Sinai Hospital, New York
- Website: icahn.mssm.edu/research/genomics-institute

The Icahn Genomics Institute is a biomedical and genomics research institute within the Icahn School of Medicine at Mount Sinai in New York City. Its aim is to establish a new generation of medicines that can better treat diseases afflicting the world, including cancer, heart disease and infectious pathogens. To do this, the institute's doctors and scientists are developing and employing new types of treatments that utilize DNA and RNA based therapies, such as CRISPR, siRNA, RNA vaccines, and CAR T cells, and searching for novel drug targets through the use of functional genomics and data science. The institute is led by Brian Brown, a leading expert in gene therapy, genetic engineering, and molecular immunology.

== Goals ==
The institute's primary goal is to improve patient care through the use of gene, cell and nucleotide therapies. To achieve this goal, the Institute is formed of a cross-disciplinary mix of clinicians and scientists that include physicians treating patients with novel gene therapies in the Mount Sinai Health System, biologists developing and testing new drugs and drug platforms, and data scientists working to identify causative agents of disease that can be targeted for therapy by building predictive models that better characterize disease. These models are constructed with multiple layers of biological data, including gene expression, metabolite, DNA, and protein information, and are combined with phenotypic and clinical data, predictive modeling, and probabilistic analysis to try to elucidate the complex mechanisms of disease.

== Research ==
Research at the institute falls into six areas:

- RNA Therapeutics and Nanomedicines
- Gene, CRISPR, and Cell Engineering
- Asthma and allergies
- Viral and Microbial Therapeutics
- Cancer Gene and Cell Therapy
- Therapeutic Target Discovery

== Notable academic publications ==
Scientists from the institute published a paper in Nature Genetics in 2012 demonstrating the ability to derive enough information from non-DNA sources to identify individuals whose supposedly anonymized biological data is stored in large research databases. The authors reported that measuring RNA levels in tissue allowed them to infer a genetic barcode that could be used to match other materials to that same individual. This was noteworthy as validation of existing concerns among genomics scientists that it may not be possible to prevent the identification of an individual from genetic data even when that data is meant to be anonymous.

In a PLoS Biology paper, institute founding director Eric Schadt led a research team that utilized six different types of data (metabolite concentration, gene expression, DNA variation, DNA-protein binding, protein-metabolite interaction, and protein–protein interaction) to reconstruct networks involved in cell regulation.

In 2013, institute scientists published a paper in the journal Cell reporting findings from a network-based study of late-onset Alzheimer's disease. The researchers constructed gene regulatory networks and discovered a neural structure involved in a pathway associated with onset of the disease.

In January 2014, scientists from the institute's Division of Psychiatric Genomics including Pamela Sklar published two papers in the journal Nature that explored the genetic complexity of schizophrenia. The exome sequencing studies of populations in Bulgaria and Sweden revealed that the disorder is likely caused by a lot of rare genetic mutations rather than a few common mutations. The projects also established the world's largest database on schizophrenia.

In May 2014, institute faculty published proof-of-concept findings to support the clinical development of RNA interference therapy for acute hepatic porphyria which led to the development of givosiran as the first therapy for acute hepatic porphyria, approved by the FDA in 2019. Institute researchers and clinicians also led the Phase 3 clinical trials for givosiran.

Institute director, Brian Brown, developed a new CRISPR imaging technology called Perturb-map capable of identifying regulators in tumor microenvironments. The findings were published in Cell in 2022. Perturb-map was used in this study to identify the cytokine interferon gamma, IFNg, and the tumor growth factor beta receptor, TGFbR, as regulators of two pathways significantly affecting tumor growth, architecture, and immune cell recruitment.

Institute faculty member Samir Parekh published results of a clinical trial in Blood Advances (2022) focused on second-line treatments for relapsed multiple myeloma patients. The study reported over an 80% response rate in patients treated with T-cell redirection therapy with chimeric antigen receptor (CAR)-T cells and bispecific antibodies (BiAbs) as a second-line treatment after a first-line immunotherapy treatment had failed.

Also in 2022, Brian Brown's research published results of a study targeting solid tumors with chimeric antigen receptor (CAR)-T cell therapy, which had previously only been successful in blood cancers. The researchers engineered CAR T cells to target and destroy macrophages, an immune cell supporting tumor growth, in ovarian, lung, and pancreatic tumors in mice models, which successfully shrunk tumors and prolonged survival.

Institute faculty member Ivan Marazzi's research team published a Nature paper in 2022 identifying the immune system's role in amyotrophic lateral sclerosis (ALS). The study found immune system dysfunction in patients and mice with ALS, and showed a high concentration of CD8 T cells in spinal cord and blood. The study was among the first publications to describe the immune system's involvement in neurodegeneration.

== History ==
The institute was formed in 2011 as the Institute for Genomics and Multiscale Biology, as part of Mount Sinai's Department of Genetics and Genomic Sciences. Eric Schadt was named as founding director. The institute was renamed in 2012 when philanthropist Carl Icahn pledged $200 million to its parent organization, the Icahn School of Medicine at Mount Sinai.

In 2012, the institute received certification for the first CLIA-approved next-generation sequencing lab in New York City.

Institute faculty Andrew Kasarskis, Michael Linderman, George Diaz, Ali Bashir, and Randi Zinberg taught the first class in which Mount Sinai medical students were able to fully sequence and analyze their own genomes.

Former institute member Joel Dudley was named one of the 100 most creative people in business in a 2014 list compiled by Fast Company. The magazine said it chose Dudley "for splicing information with quality medical care."

In 2014 the institute, in collaboration with Sage Bionetworks, announced a new project aiming to genotype up to 1 million people with the goal of identifying the rare biological mechanisms that keep people healthy when they have genetic variants that should cause disease. The Resilience Project aimed to scan the genomes of healthy people age 30 and older who contribute their DNA to the effort with an initial focus on 127 diseases. Scientists anticipated that finding protective mechanisms for Mendelian diseases would be more straightforward than finding ones for complex or multifactorial diseases. Based on an analysis of publicly available data from 600,000 human genomes, scientists involved in the Resilience Project estimated that one person in 15,000 has a mechanism protecting against disease-causing genetic variants.

In 2022, institute faculty Pei Wang and Avi Ma'ayan established a Proteogenomic Data Analysis Center funded by the National Cancer Institute. The center's goals included identification of biomarkers and drug targets for cancer and development of computational tools for drug discovery.
