= Gustavo Stolovitzky =

IBM Fellow and computational systems biologist

Gustavo A. Stolovitzky is an Argentine-American computational systems biologist. He was the CSO of Sema4 and then of GeneDx until December 2023. Between 1998 and 2021 he was a researcher and executive at IBM Research. At IBM he served in several roles including founding chair of the Exploratory Life Sciences Council and director of the Translational Systems Biology and Nano-Biotechnology Program at IBM Research. From 2013 to 2018 he was Adjunct professor of Genetics and Genomic Sciences at the Icahn School of Medicine at Mount Sinai and from 2007 he has been an Adjunct Associate Professor of Biomedical Informatics at Columbia University. His research has been cited more than 29,000 times

Stolovitzky is a co-founder of the Dialogue for Reverse Engineering Assessments and Methods (DREAM). DREAM is an international collaborative effort that leverages crowdsourcing to recognize effective methods in biomedicine and consists of more than 15,000 participants. Stolovitzky won the IBM Fellow award for pioneering the use of crowdsourcing for research in computational biology.

== Career ==
Stolovitzky received his M.Sc. in physics from the University of Buenos Aires in 1987, and his PhD in mechanical engineering from Yale University in 1994. In 1998, Stolovitzky joined IBM Research to work in the field of computational systems biology; he has since become the director of IBM's Translational Systems Biology and Nano-Biotechnology Program. He is also an adjunct professor at Columbia University and a postdoctoral researcher at the Center for Studies in Physics and Biology at The Rockefeller University. In 2005, Stolovitzky and Jared Roach developed sophisticated methods for the analysis of Massively Parallel Signature Sequencing (MPSS) data. In 2008, he was a visiting scholar at the Institute for Advanced Study.

Solovitztky has advocated the usage of crowdsourcing as a tool for scientific research.

== Recognition ==
Stolovitzky has received the Hispanic Engineer National Achievement Awards Corporation (HENAAC)'s Pioneer Award for Great Minds in STEM and the World Technology Award in Biotechnology in 2013, and the Raíces Prize from the Argentinian government in 2017. Stolovitzky is also a member of the IBM Academy of Technology and has been inducted as a Fellow of the New York Academy of Sciences, Fellow of the World Technology Network, Fellow of the American Physical Society, and Fellow of the American Association for the Advancement of Science.

In 2019, Stolovitzky was appointed as an IBM Fellow, the highest technical honor IBM bestows to its employees.

In 2021, Stolovitzky was elected as a Fellow of the International Society for Computational Biology.

== Family ==
Stolovitzky resides in the Northeastern United States with his family.

== History ==
Stolovitzky received his M.Sc. in physics (with honors) from the University of Buenos Aires, Argentina, in 1987 and his Ph.D. in mechanical engineering from Yale University in 1994. He later explained that during a visit he paid to a friend studying in Yale, he met with K.R. Sreenivasan, who "called the provost and asked if he could add me as a PhD student, even though I hadn't formally applied to Yale and all the deadlines had already passed." He did his postdoctorate at the Center for Studies in Physics and Biology at The Rockefeller University, following which he joined IBM Research in 1998.

== Titles and awards ==
Among others, Gustavo has received the following awards and titles:

- IBM Fellow
- Distinguished Research Staff Member in the IBM Computational Biology Center
- IBM Master Inventor
- Fellow of the NY Academy of Sciences
- Fellow of the American Physical Society (2007)
- Fellow of the American Association for the Advancement of Science
- HEENAC Pioneer Award to Great Minds in STEM, awarded by the Hispanic Engineer National Achievement Awards Conference (2013)
- World Technology Awards in the Category "Biotechnology", awarded by the World Technology Network (2013)
- Henry Prentiss Becton Prize, awarded by the Faculty of Engineering at Yale University for Excellence in Engineering and Applied Science (1995)
- Fellow of the World Technology Network
