= Synapse.org =

- Type: non-profit organization
- Purpose: Open science
- Parent organization: Sage Bionetworks
- Website: synapse.org

Synapse.org is an open source platform for collaborative scientific data analysis. It can store data, code, results, and descriptions research work. It is operated by nonprofit organization Sage Bionetworks.

The Synapse web portal is an online registry of research projects that allows data scientists to discover and share data, models, and analysis methods.
