= Chinese National Human Genome Center, Beijing =

National-level genome research center in Beijing, China

Chinese National Human Genome Center (国家人类基因组北方研究中心), Beijing (CHGB), was established as one of the national-level genome research center approved by the Ministry of Science & Technology.

CHGB promotes the commercialization of research products and initiate genome industry in China. As a national research institution, CHGB integrates all high-level activities in basic research, clinical investigation, population genetics and bioinformatics projects in Beijing and North China.

Prof. Boqin Qiang, academician of CAS, is Director and Chief Scientist of CHGB. Prof. Wu Min, academician of CAS, is the honorary Chairman of the academic committee. Prof. Yan Shen, academician of CAS, Prof. Fuchu He, academician of CAS, Prof. Dalong Ma, and Prof. Biao Chen are deputy directors of CHGB.

== See also ==
- Beijing Genomics Institute
- List of genetics research organizations
