= Sage Bionetworks =

Non-profit open science organization

- Formation: 2009; 17 years ago
- Founders: Stephen Friend; Eric Schadt
- Type: Non-profit organization
- Purpose: Open science; Medical research
- Headquarters: Seattle, WA
- Location: United States
- President and CEO: Luca Foschini
- COO: Andrea Varsavsky
- CDO: Susheel Varma
- Chief Privacy and Compliance Officer: Christine Suver
- Board of directors: Stephen Friend; Luca Foschini; Anthony W. Ford-Hutchinson; Tetsu Maruyama; Eric Schadt; Gustavo A. Stolovitzky; Carole Goble; Andrea Varsavsky
- Affiliations: Fred Hutchinson Cancer Research Center
- Website: www.sagebionetworks.org

Sage Bionetworks is a nonprofit organization in Seattle that promotes open science and patient engagement in the research process. It is led by Luca Foschini. It was co-founded by Stephen Friend and Eric Schadt.

== Open science ==
Sage Bionetworks is notable for being an early advocate of open science. The company operates a software platform for collaborative data analysis called Synapse that allows researchers to work together on data curation and computational modeling asynchronously in a manner inspired by GitHub. Synapse also serves as the software infrastructure for running computational challenges. Sage is also developing a citizen-science platform called Bridge.

== Research ==
The bulk of Sage's scientific results emerge from cancer and neurosciences, with notable contributions to the Cancer Genome Atlas Pan-Cancer project. Another Sage initiative, The Resilience Project describes itself as a search for individuals who have genetic changes expected to cause severe illness but who remain perfectly healthy. The hope is to yield insight into factors that protect these individuals from disease. In 2019 Sage Bionetworks has joined Open-AD Drug Discovery Center, which aims to find new Alzheimer's drugs. “This project stitches together open science approaches in computational and experimental research,” Sage president Dr. Lara Mangravite said in a statement.

== History ==
Sage Bionetworks was founded in 2009 as a spinout of Merck & Co., who released software, hardware, intellectual property, and staff connected to its Rosetta Inpharmatics unit. A donation from Quintiles provided early funding.

In March 2011 Sage partnered with CHDI Foundation to develop computer simulations for studying Huntington's disease. At the same time Sage also announced a partnership with Takeda Pharmaceutical Company wherein Sage would do research to identify biological targets for central nervous system diseases.

In February 2013, Sage Bionetworks partnered with the Dialogue on Reverse Engineering Assessment and Methods (DREAM) project to provide expertise and infrastructure for DREAM Challenges on the Synapse.org platform.

In September 2019, Sage announced a partnership with Cornell Tech, the University of California, San Francisco, Open mHealth and The Commons Project to develop an electronic health data management program called CommonHealth. The program would use Health Level Seven International standards for compatibility with both Apple Health and a similar app on Android devices.

== See also ==
- The Resilience Project
