= Rob Swigart =

American novelist (born 1941)

- Born: 1941 (age 84–85)
- Occupation: Professor
- Writing career
- Genres: Electronic literature American postmodern literature
- Subjects: Science fiction and digital literature author
- Notable works: Portal (1979 and 2023)

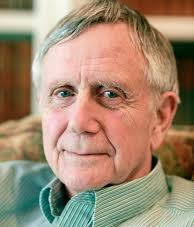

Rob Swigart (born January 7, 1941) is an American novelist, poet, short story writer, futurist, and archaeology scholar best known for his satirical work, archaeology writing, science fiction, and interactive novel computer game, Portal (Activision, 1986). He is the author of sixteen books, including fourteen novels, one business book, and one translated prose poem.

His second novel, A.K.A./A Cosmic Fable, was nominated for a BSFA Best Novel Award in 1979.

His latest novel, Mixed Harvest, won a Nautilus Gold Award in 2019.

Swigart's poetry and fiction have appeared in a number of magazines, including Antaeus, Atlantic Monthly, Epoch, Fiction, Michigan Quarterly Review, New England Review, New York Quarterly, Poetry, Poetry Northwest, and South Carolina Review.

== Life and career ==
Rob Swigart was born in Chicago to attorney Eugene Swigart Jr. and actress Ruth Robison Swigart. His family moved to Cincinnati, where Swigart grew up, in 1947. He currently lives in California.

Swigart majored in English at Princeton University and received a PhD in comparative literature from the State University of New York at Buffalo.

=== Teaching ===
Rob Swigart was an associate professor at San Jose University for 35 years, after which he was visiting scholar at the Stanford University Archaeology Center. His research, teaching, and archaeological writing focus on ancient societies and the 6,000–8,000 years during which humans adopted agriculture, as well as the consequences of this switch from a nomadic hunter-gatherer lifestyle to farming.

=== Writing ===
Swigart began writing at a young age, first poetry and then short stories. He started writing seriously in graduate school, as he studied literature and taught fiction writing. The stories he wrote as a graduate student grew into his first novel, Little America (1977). He then went on to publish two more novels in a similar satirical style.

In the 1970s and into the 1980s, Swigart's poetry was published in a number of literary magazines across the United States, including Poetry, Poetry Northwest, Beloit Poetry Journal, The Reed, New York Quarterly, and Michigan Quarterly magazines.

Building upon an early interest in archaeology discovered while visiting sites around Central America, Swigart later wrote two archaeological novels published as textbooks, Xibalbá Gate (2005) and Stone Mirror (2007), while he was a visiting scholar at the Stanford Archaeology Center.

Following the release of Stone Mirror, he attended a series of seminars at Çatalhöyük, where he was a novelist in residence in 2005. The seminars, focusing on the connection between religion and the development of cities, inspired his collection of stories about the human past, Mixed Harvest (2019), which explores what happened before religion and sedentism.

Swigart also published the Thriller in Paradise series, technothrillers set in Hawaii; and the ongoing Lisa Emmer series of historical thrillers.

=== Electronic literature ===
Swigart contributed to the Eastgate Quarterly Review of Hypertext, a digital literary periodical produced by Eastgate Systems and distributed via floppy disks in folios. His multimedia hypertext work, “Directions,” was published in issue 1:4 (Eastgate Quarterly Review of Hypertext, 1994). The work includes astronomical images, scientific graphs and maps, poetry, prose, black and white BITMAP images, and sound effects all arranged in a modified Periodic Table of Elements.

Following, Swigart was a founding member and secretary of the Electronic Literature Organization (ELO). During his time at ELO, Swigart participated in the Preservation, Archiving, Dissemination Project, an initiative that considered how to move electronic literature from defunct platforms to current technologies. He also published interactive multimedia novella About Time and other hypertext fiction and poetry, including short story “Seeking."

=== Futurist ===
Swigart worked as a research affiliate for the Institute for the Future, US-based not-for-profit think tank established to help organizations understand trends and plan for the future.

As a futurist, Swigart developed scenarios and wrote stories around topics such as climate change.

== Satire fiction ==
Swigart published three satire novels in the late 1970s: Little America (1977), A.K.A./A Cosmic Fable (1978), and The Time Trip (1979). Swigart's satirical work has been called avant-garde and postmodern, as well as absurd and iconoclastic for its unconventional style and content.

A.K.A./A Cosmic Fable was nominated for the BSFA Best Novel Award in 1979, alongside J. G. Ballard’s The Unlimited Dream Company, Tom Reamy’s Blind Voices, Thomas M. Disch’s On Wings of Song, and Arthur C. Clarke’s The Fountains of Paradise.

== Science fiction ==
Though Swigart's satirical work has elements of science fiction, Swigart's first science fiction novel, The Book of Revelations, was published by E. P. Dutton Co. in 1981. It is an experimental New Wave science fiction novel about a futures researcher in California.

=== Portal (1986) ===
Portal is a text-driven adventure computer game published for the Amiga in 1986 by Activision. Ports to the Commodore 64, Apple II, MS-DOS, and Macintosh were released later. A version for the Atari ST was announced and developed but never released.

The user plays as an unnamed astronaut who returns from a failed 100-year voyage, only to find that humans have disappeared from Earth. The astronaut discovers a barely functional computer connected to a storytelling mainframe called Homer. Homer tells stories of the past, but much of his memory is missing. With the computer and Homer's help, the player attempts to piece together a narrative and discover what happened to the human race.

Swigart later published a hardcover novel building upon the story, Portal: A Dataspace Retrieval (1988).

In April 2012, Subliminal Games launched a Kickstarter crowdfunding campaign to recreate Portal as a modern third-person adventure game. The project was cancelled in June 2012 after falling short of the funding target.

== Awards and nominations ==
- 1979: British Science Fiction Association Best Novel Award for A.K.A./A Cosmic Fable (nomination)
- 2019: Nautilus Gold Award in Multicultural & Indigenous Category (winner)

== Bibliography ==
=== Novels ===
- Little America (1977). Boston: Houghton Mifflin. ISBN 978-0-395-25443-1
- A.K.A./A Cosmic Fable (1978). Boston: Houghton Mifflin. ISBN 978-0-395-26384-6
  - Nominated for BSFA Best Novel Award, 1979
- The Time Trip (1979). Boston: Houghton Mifflin. ISBN 978-0-395-27757-7
- The Book of Revelations (1981) Boston: E. P. Dutton. ISBN 978-0-525-03051-5
- Vector (1986) New York: St. Martin's Press. ISBN 978-0-312-94446-9
- Portal: A Dataspace Retrieval (1988) New York: St. Martin's Press. ISBN 978-0-312-01494-0
  - First published as interactive software Portal by Activision (1986, 1987)
- Toxin (1989) New York: St Martin's Press. ISBN 978-0-312-02661-5
- Venom (1991) New York: St Martin's Press. ISBN 978-0-312-05986-6
- Xibalbá Gate: A Novel of the Ancient Maya (2005) Lanham: AltaMira Press. ISBN 978-0-759-10879-0
- Stone Mirror: A Novel of the Neolithic (2007) Walnut Creek: Routledge. ISBN 978-1-598-74017-2
- The White Pig (2007) Nel Mezzo Della Vita Press. ISBN 978-0-615-14541-9
- The Delphi Agenda (2013) BooksBNimble. ASIN B00AGZEHYO
- Tablet of Destinies (2016) BooksBNimble. ASIN B01B3YBAB4
- Mixed Harvest (2019) Berghahn Books. ISBN 978-1-78920-620-3
  - Winner of Nautilus Gold Award in the Multicultural and Indigenous category, 2019

=== Short fiction ===
- “In the Net of Life and Time” (1987, in Fantasy Book)
- “Down Time” (Fall 1987, in New England Review)
- “The Glitch” (Winter 1992, in Fiction)
- “Dispersion” (2006, in Electronic Book Review)
- “Seeking” (2007, in Electronic Book Review)
- “Water” (2019, in the Fictional Café)
- “Mine” (Spring 2020, in Jet Fuel Review)
- “The Factory” (Spring 2020, in Deadly Writers Patrol)
- “Sigrid” (2020, in Sublunary Review)
- "Disappointment" (Winter 2021, in Stonecoast Review)
- "Floater" (Spring 2021, in South Carolina Review)
- "The Memory of Charles Babbage" (Spring 2021, in mojo)
- "A Kind Word Alone" (Summer 2021, in The Nonconformist)
  - Republished in print edition (2022, in The Nonconformist #1)

=== Poetry ===
- “The Sin of Seven” (1973, in Poetry #112)
- "Retroactive Debridement” (1975, in Poetry #126)
- "Still Lives” (1975, in Poetry #126)
- “On Reading the Norton Anthology of Poetry” (1971, in Epoch #20)
- “The Relationship Between a Police Report and a Poem” (1971–72, in Poetry Northwest #12.4)
- “God=3d Law of Thermodynamics” (1971–72, in Poetry Northwest #12.4)
- “Uncle Toy’s Garlic Armchair Diesel” (1972, in the Beloit Poetry Journal #22)
- “Galactophilia: According to Hoyle” (1972, in the Beloit Poetry Journal #22)
- “Mountain Storm” (1972, in Choice: A Magazine of Poetry and Graphics #7/8)
- “Two Shades of Blue” (1972, in Choice: A Magazine of Poetry and Graphics #7/8)
- “A Regrettable But Necessary Sacrifice” (1972, in Choice: A Magazine of Poetry and Graphics #7/8)
- “Some Saturday Afternoons in Lackawanna, New York, I see An Anonymous Couple” (1972, in Choice: A Magazine of Poetry and Graphics #7/8)
- Translations from modern Greek of C.P. Cavafy, “Nero’s Term,” “King Demetrios,” “The Retinue of Dionysus,” “Orophernes” (1972, in Anteaus #7)
- “Love Poem for Jane” (1972, in Rapport #2/3)
- “The Wind Tunnel” (1972, in Poetry Northwest #14.4)
- “Fourteen Arms of the Dancing God” (1973, in Buffalo Spree)
- “Ear” (1973, in Buffalo Spree)
- “Night Sky Over Belsen” (1973, in Buffalo Spree)
- “The Bridgemaker Takes a Stroll” (1973, in The Reed #26)
- “Recipe” (1973, in The Reed #26)
- “The Execution” (1973, in the New York Quarterly #15)
- “Little Girl Lost” (1974, in Poetry Northwest #15.1)
- “Jousting at the Ballpark” (1974, in The Reed)
- “The President and the Four Swiss Cows” (1974, in The Reed)
- “The Art of Composition” (1974, in the Atlantic Monthly)
- "Postcard from Knossos” (Chelsea Review #33)
- “The Tide Ebbs from the Airport Waiting Room” (Chelsea Review #33)
- “The Telephone” (Chelsea Review #33)
- “Death of an Astronomer,” “Flag,” “Note to the Morning Shift,” and “Glacial,” (1974, in Famous Writers’ Anthology)
- “Prayer to the God of Empty Spaces Yawning” (1975, in Michigan Quarterly #14)
- “The Gardener” (1975, in Michigan Quarterly #14 )
- “The ‘I’ of the Poem Builds a Box” (1975, in Poetry Northwest #16.1)
- “Construction Zone” (1975, in Masks #16)
- “Up the Creek” (1975, in Masks #16)
- “Bone Poem” (1977, in Poetry Northwest #18.1 )
- “Billy the Kid Plays Squash with the President of General Motors” (1977, in Choice: A Magazine of Poetry and Graphics #10)
- “A Landscape House Hawks and Us” (1977, in Choice: A Magazine of Poetry and Graphics #10)
- “The Speaker” (1977, in California State Poetry Quarterly #5)
- “Variations on a Portrait” (1977, in California State Poetry Quarterly #5)
- “Sestina: Interlude” (1979, in the Buffalo Evening News)
- “Enkidu as Track Star” (1979, in the Buffalo Evening News)
- “Telephone Sonnet” (1988, in Poetry Northwest #29.1)
- “Bedtime” (1988, in Poetry Northwest #29.1)
- “Directions” (1994, in The Eastgate Quarterly Review of Hypertext #1.4 )

=== Anthologies and collections ===
- Women Poets of the World . Prentice Hall, 1983. ISBN 978-0023057205
  - Translations from Ono No Komachi
    - “No moon, no chance to meet”
    - “If it were real”
    - Since I’ve felt this pain”
- Coast Light: An Anthology. Coastlight Press, 1981. ISBN 9780960628803
  - “Gilgamesh In Chinatown”
- The Art of Human-Computer Interface Design . Addison-Wesley, 1990. ISBN 978-0-201-51797-2
  - “The Writer’s Desktop”
- World Poetry: An Anthology of Verse from Antiquity to Our Time. W.W. Norton & Company, 2000. ISBN 978-0-393-04130-9
  - Translation from Pan Chao, “Needle and Thread”
- An Outriders Anthology: Poetry in Buffalo 1969–1979 and After . Outriders Poetry Project, 2013. ISBN 978-0984177288
  - “Billy The Kid Plays Squash with the President of General Motors”

=== Reviews, articles, and essays ===
- “Theocritus’ City Women” (1973, in the Bucknell Review #21)
- “Computer Generations” (1984, in West Magazine)
- “The Rhythm of Rock” (1984, in California Living)
- “Classics Re-Examined: The Time of Death and the Death of Time: Genji Sex and the Victorian Sensorium Lady Murasaki.” (1984, in the San Francisco Jung Institute Library Journal #5.2 )
- “A Look at What’s Ahead” (1985, in MacWorld #2.4 )
- “They’re Playing Our Song” (1986, in MacWorld #3.2 )
- “Sexual Fantasy and the Literature of Despair” (1982, in Spirales, translated into French)
- “Computer Narrative” (1987, in New England Review #10.1)
- “Digital Puppeteers” (1991, in NewMedia Age #1.2)
- “Spaceship Warlock: Pushing the Edge” (1991, in NewMedia Age #1.5)
- “Tecnotetimismo in Star Trek: Primo Contatto” (1988, in Star Trek: Il cielo è il limite, ed. Franco La Polla, Lindau, ISBN 9788871802220)
- “Satisfying Ambiguity” (2002, in Tamara: A Journal of Critical Post-Modern Organizational Science #1.4)
- “Satisfying Ambiguity” (2004, in Electronic Book Review)
- “Past Futures, Future’s Past” (2004, in Electronic Book Review )
- “Not Just a River” (2006, in Electronic Book Review )
- “The Rarest Tuscan Cheese” (Life in Italy, 2008)
- “Anomalies” (2011, in Electronic Book Review)

=== Nonfiction and translations ===
- Upsizing the Individual in the Downsized Organization (1994), with Robert Johansen. Boston: Addison-Wesley. ISBN 978-0-201-48940-8
- La Bièvre (2005), by J-K Huysmans, translated by Rob Swigart. Paris: Editions Illouz/Rob Swigart.
  - Published with original lithographs by Claire Illouz.

=== Computer games ===
- Murder on the Mississippi: The Adventures of Sir Charles Foxworth (1986, Activision)
- Portal (1986, Activision)

=== Film and television ===
- Inishmaan...Beyond the Pale (Marley & Swigart Productions, 1977)
- “Not in Our Stars, Hard Time on Planet Earth (Disney-CBS, 1989)
