= Charleston church shooting =

2015 mass shooting in South Carolina, U.S.

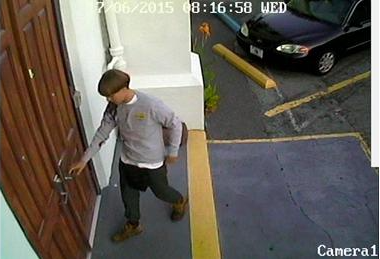
- Roof entering the Emanuel African Methodist Episcopal Church at 8:16 p.m., shortly before the attack.

- Charleston church shooting (South Carolina) Charleston church shooting (the United States) Charleston, South Carolina
- Location: 32°47′15″N 79°55′59″W; Emanuel African Methodist Episcopal Church
- Date: June 17, 2015; 11 years ago c. 9:05 – c. 9:11 p.m. (EDT)
- Target: African American churchgoers at a church congregation
- Attack type: Mass shooting; mass murder; domestic terrorism; right-wing terrorism; hate crime
- Weapon: .45-caliber Glock 41 handgun
- Deaths: 9
- Injuries: 1
- Perpetrator: Dylann Roof
- Motive: White supremacy/nationalism; Accelerationist neo-Nazism; Desire to start a race war; Anti-black racism; Belief in the white genocide conspiracy theory
- Verdict: Guilty on all counts
- Convictions: 33 federal counts; 13 state counts; (Note: Federal: Hate crimes resulting in death (9 counts); Hate crimes involving an intent to kill (3 counts); Obstruction of religious exercise resulting in death (9 counts); Obstruction of religious exercise involving an intent to kill using a weapon (3 counts); Use of a firearm during a crime of violence resulting in death (9 counts); South Carolina: Murder (9 counts); Attempted murder (3 counts); Possession of a weapon during the commission of a violent crime)
- Sentence: Federal; Death; State; 9 consecutive life sentences without the possibility of parole plus 95 years

On June 17, 2015, a terrorist mass shooting and anti-Black hate crime occurred in Charleston, South Carolina. Nine people were killed and another was injured during a Bible study at the Emanuel African Methodist Episcopal Church, the oldest black church in the Southern United States. Among the fatalities was the senior pastor, state senator Clementa C. Pinckney. All ten victims were African Americans.

Dylann Roof, a 21-year-old white supremacist and neo-Nazi, had attended the Bible study before opening fire. He was found to have targeted members of this church because of its history and status. In December 2016, Roof was convicted of 33 federal hate crime and murder charges. On January 10, 2017, he was sentenced to death for those crimes. Roof was separately charged with nine counts of murder in the South Carolina state courts. In April 2017, Roof pleaded guilty to all nine state charges in order to avoid receiving a second death sentence, and as a result, he was sentenced to life imprisonment without the possibility of parole. He will receive automatic appeals of his death sentence, but he may eventually be executed by the federal justice system; Roof was one of three inmates on federal death row whose sentence was not commuted by President Joe Biden prior to leaving office.

Roof espoused racial hatred in both a website manifesto which he published before the shooting, and a journal which he wrote from jail afterward. On his website, Roof posted photos of emblems which are associated with white supremacy, including a photo of the Confederate battle flag. The shooting triggered debates about modern display of the flag and other commemorations of the Confederacy. Following these murders, the South Carolina General Assembly voted to remove the flag from State Capitol grounds and a wave of Confederate monument or memorial removals followed shortly thereafter.

== Background ==
Founded in 1816, the church has played an important role in the history of South Carolina, including the slavery era and Reconstruction, the civil rights movement, and Black Lives Matter. It is the oldest African Methodist Episcopal Church in the South, often referred to as "Mother Emanuel". The AME Church was founded by Richard Allen in Philadelphia, Pennsylvania, in 1814 as the first independent black denomination. It is a historically black congregation, one of the oldest south of Baltimore.

When one of the church's co-founders, Denmark Vesey, was suspected of plotting to launch a slave rebellion in Charleston in 1822, 35 people, including Vesey, were hanged and the church was burned down. Charleston citizens accepted the claim that a slave rebellion was expected to begin at the stroke of midnight on June 16, 1822, and it was expected to erupt the following day (the shooting in 2015 occurred on the 193rd anniversary of the thwarted uprising). As the rebuilt church was formally shuttered with other all-black congregations by the city in 1834, the congregation met in secret until 1865 when it was formally reorganized, and it acquired the name Emanuel ("God with us"). It was rebuilt based on a design which was drawn by Denmark Vesey's son. That structure was badly damaged in the 1886 Charleston earthquake. The existing building dates from 1891.

The church's senior pastor, the Rev. Clementa C. Pinckney, had held rallies after the shooting of Walter Scott by a white police officer two months earlier, in nearby North Charleston. As a state senator, Pinckney pushed for legislation requiring police to wear body cameras.

Several commentators noted that a similarity existed between the massacre at Emanuel AME and the 1963 16th Street Baptist Church bombing of a politically active African-American church in Birmingham, Alabama, where the Ku Klux Klan (KKK) killed four black girls and injured fourteen others, during the civil rights movement. This attack galvanized support for federal civil rights legislation.

Numerous scholars, journalists, activists and politicians have emphasized their belief that the attack should not be treated as an isolated event because in their view, it occurred within the broader context of racism against Black Americans and racism in the United States. In 1996, Congress had passed the Church Arson Prevention Act, which considers the damaging of religious property a federal crime because of its "racial or ethnic character", in response to a spate of 154 suspicious church burnings which had occurred since 1991. More recent arson attacks against black churches included a black church in Massachusetts that was burned down the day after the first inauguration of Barack Obama in 2009.

== Shooting ==
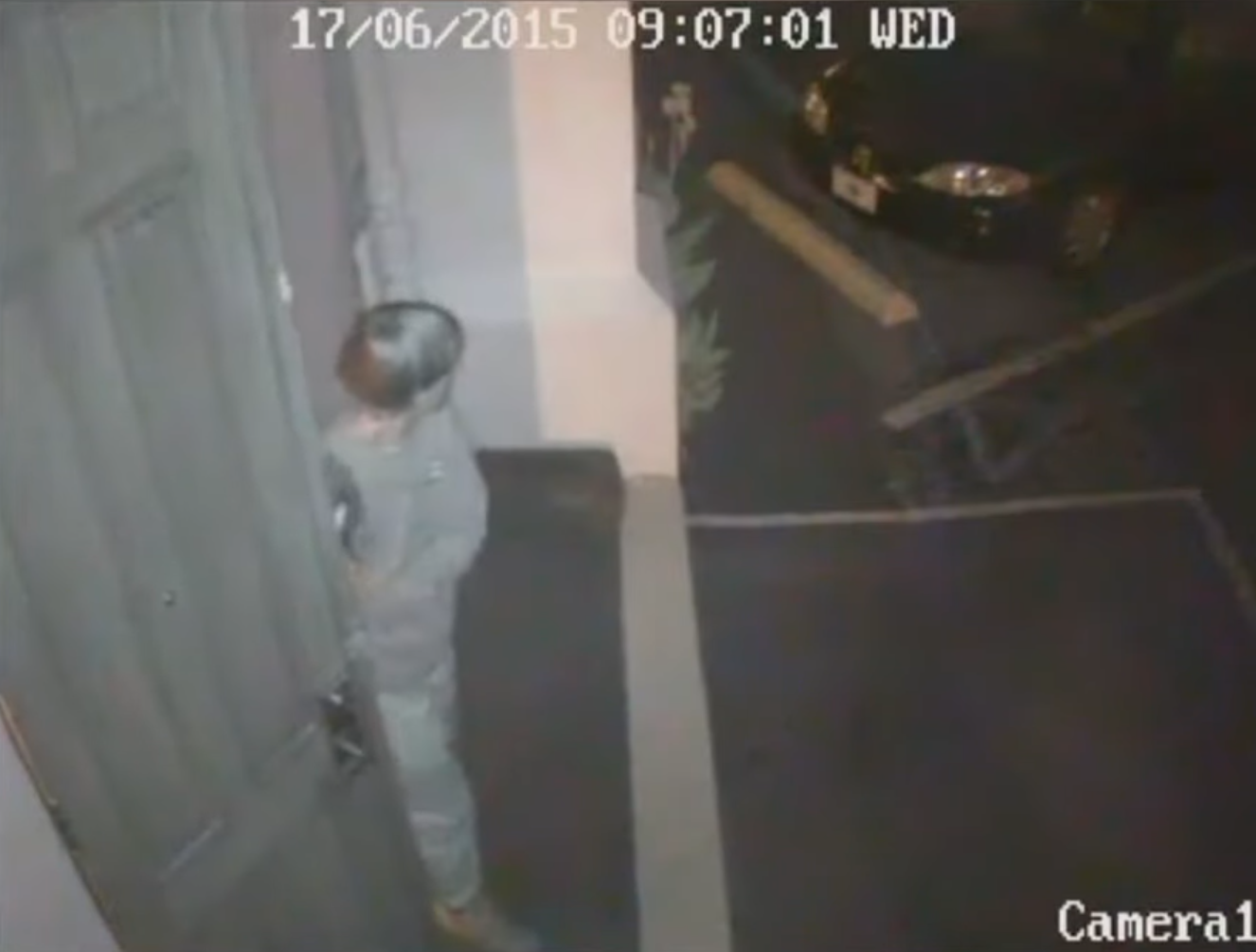
Dylann Roof exiting the Emanuel African Methodist Episcopal Church at 9:07 p.m., shortly after the attack.

At around 9:05 p.m. EDT on Wednesday, June 17, 2015, the Charleston Police Department began receiving calls of a shooting at Emanuel AME Church. Dylann S. Roof, a man described as white, with sandy-brown hair, around 21 years old and 5 feet 9 inches (175 cm) in height, wearing a gray sweatshirt and jeans, opened fire with a Glock 41 .45-caliber handgun on a group of people inside the church at a Bible study attended by Pinckney. He had first attended the meeting as a participant that evening. Roof then fled the scene. He had been carrying a total of eight magazines when he entered, holding 11 hollow-point bullets each, for a total of 88 bullets. The event was finished by about 9:11 p.m.

During the hour preceding the attack, 13 people including the shooter participated in the Bible study. According to the accounts of people who talked to survivors, when Roof walked into the historic African-American church, he immediately asked for Pinckney and sat down next to him, initially listening to others during the study. He disagreed with some of the discussion of Scripture. After other participants began praying, he stood up, and aimed a gun he pulled from a fanny pack at 41-year-old Reverend Pinckney. He shot Pinckney five times. Reverend Daniel Simmons rose up from his seat and shouted, "Let me see my pastor. I need to check my pastor!" Roof aimed at Simmons and shot him five times as he was attempting to reach the side door to escape. Roof walked up to Simmons, who was lying down just in front of the side door, and fired one more shot into him at point-blank. Roof started opening fire at the rest of the people in the Bible study. He fired at the other victims, shouting racial epithets. He paced around the room, repeatedly fired at the churchgoers' bodies, and reloaded. He shot people hiding under the tables and also shot a bible. At one point, Roof overheard Polly Sheppard praying and told her to "shut up," saying he would leave Sheppard alive as a witness to the shooting. Just after Roof talked to Sheppard, 26-year-old Tywanza Sanders, while injured, stood up from the floor. He tried to talk Roof down and asked him why he was attacking churchgoers. The shooter said, "I have to do it. You rape our women and you're taking over the nation. And you have to go." Roof shot Sanders multiple times. Roof reportedly said, "Y'all want something to pray about? I'll give you something to pray about." Throughout the shooting, Roof reloaded his gun seven times. After Sanders was critically wounded, Sheppard used a cellphone to call 911. As the call was made, Roof decided to leave the church. He exited through a side door, reloaded his handgun again, and left the scene by car. Sanders' mother and his five-year-old niece, who also attended the study, survived the shooting by pretending to be dead on the floor. Sanders later died at the scene.

Dot Scott, president of the local branch of the NAACP, said she had heard from victims' relatives that Roof spared one woman (Polly Sheppard), saying that she could tell other people what happened. He asked, "Did I shoot you?" She replied, "No." Then, he said, "Good, 'cause we need someone to survive, because I'm gonna shoot myself, and you'll be the only survivor." According to the son of one victim, who spoke to that survivor, Roof allegedly turned the gun to his own head and pulled the trigger, but discovered he was out of ammunition. He left the church, reportedly after making another "racially inflammatory statement" over the victims' bodies. The entire shooting lasted for approximately six minutes.

Several hours later, a bomb threat was called into the Courtyard by Marriott hotel on Calhoun Street. This complicated the police investigation of the shooting, as they needed to evacuate the immediate area.

=== Victims ===
The mortally wounded victims, six women and three men, were all African-American members of the AME Church. Eight died at the scene; the ninth, Daniel Simmons, died at MUSC Medical Center. They were all killed by multiple gunshots fired at close range, with 54 projectiles being recovered from the nine bodies. Five people survived the shooting unharmed, including Felicia Sanders, mother of slain victim Tywanza Sanders, and her five-year-old granddaughter, as well as Polly Sheppard, a Bible study member. Pinckney's wife and youngest daughter were inside the building during the shooting, but were in the pastor's office with the door locked. A tenth victim was initially stated to be injured in the event. However, no official record indicates a wounded survivor in the Bible study. Those killed were identified as:

- Clementa C. Pinckney – the church's pastor and a South Carolina state senator.
- Cynthia Graham Hurd – a Bible study member and a branch manager for the Charleston County Public Library system; sister of former state senator Malcolm Graham.
- Susie Jackson – the oldest victim who was a Bible study and church choir member.
- Ethel Lee Lance – the church's sexton.
- Depayne Middleton-Doctor – a pastor who was also employed as a school administrator and admissions coordinator at Southern Wesleyan University.
- Tywanza Sanders – the youngest victim who was a graduate of Allen University; grandnephew of victim Susie Jackson.
- Daniel L. Simmons – a pastor who also served at Greater Zion AME Church in Awendaw.
- Sharonda Coleman-Singleton – a pastor; also a speech therapist and track coach at Goose Creek High School.
- Myra Thompson – a Bible study teacher.

The victims were later collectively referred to as "The Emanuel Nine".

== Perpetrator ==
Dylann Storm Roof was named by the Federal Bureau of Investigation (FBI) as the suspected killer after his father and uncle contacted police to positively identify him upon seeing security photos of him in the news. Roof was born in Columbia, South Carolina, and was living in largely African-American Eastover at the time of the attack. Roof had a prior police record consisting of two arrests, for trespassing and drug possession, both made in the months before the attack. According to then FBI Director James Comey, a police report detailing Roof's admission to a narcotics offense should have prevented him from purchasing the weapon used in the shooting. An administrative error within the National Instant Criminal Background Check System (NICS) excluded Roof's admission (though not the arrest itself) from appearing on his mandatory background check.

His Facebook page included an image of Roof wearing a jacket decorated with two emblems popular among American white supremacists: the flag of the former Rhodesia (now known as Zimbabwe) and the flag of apartheid-era South Africa. Roof reportedly told friends and neighbors he intended to kill people, including a plot to attack the College of Charleston, but his claims were not taken seriously. On June 20, bloggers discovered a website called "The Last Rhodesian" (www.lastrhodesian.com); it had been registered to a "Dylann Roof" on February 9, 2015. The website included what appeared to be an unsigned manifesto containing Roof's opinions of East Asians, Blacks, Jews and Hispanics as well as a cache of photos, including an image of Roof posing with a handgun and a Confederate Battle Flag. In this manifesto, Roof says he became "racially aware" as a result of the 2012 killing of Trayvon Martin, writing that when he learned about the incident, he read about it, concluding that George Zimmerman had been in the right. He did not understand the controversy about it. He said he searched for "black on White [sic] crime" on Google and found the website of a white supremacist group, the Council of Conservative Citizens, where he read "pages upon pages" of cases involving black people murdering white people. Roof wrote that he had "never been the same since that day".

According to web server logs, Roof's website was last modified at 4:44 p.m. on June 17, the day of the shooting, when Roof noted, "[A]t the time of writing I am in a great hurry."

An unidentified source said interrogations with Roof after his arrest determined he had been planning the attack for around six months. He had researched Emanuel AME Church, and targeted it because of its role in African-American history. A friend who briefly hid Roof's gun from him said, "I don't think the church was his primary target because he told us he was going for the school. But I think he couldn't get into [sic] the school because of the security ... so I think he just settled for the church."

Roof's cellphone and computer were seized and analyzed by the FBI. According to unnamed officials, he was in online communication with other white supremacists, who did not appear to have encouraged the massacre. The investigation was said to have widened to include other persons of interest.

Federal prosecutors said in August 2016 that Roof was "self-radicalized" online, instead of adopting his white supremacist ideology "through his personal associations or experiences with white supremacist groups or individuals or others".

== Manhunt and capture ==
The attack was treated as a hate crime by police. Officials from the Federal Bureau of Investigation and the Bureau of Alcohol, Tobacco, Firearms and Explosives were called in to assist in the investigation and manhunt.

On the morning after the attack, police received a tip-off from a woman who recognized Roof and his car, a black Hyundai Elantra with South Carolina license plates and a three-flag "Confederate States of America" bumper decoration, on U.S. Route 74, recalling security camera images taken at the church and distributed to the media. She later recalled, "I got closer and saw that haircut. I was nervous. I had the worst feeling. Is that him or not him?" She called her employer, who contacted local police, and then tailed the suspect's car for 35 miles (56 km) until she was certain authorities were moving in for an arrest. At 10:44 a.m., Roof was captured in a traffic stop in Shelby, North Carolina, approximately 245 miles (394 km) from the shooting scene. A .45-caliber pistol was found in the car during the arrest.

== Legal proceedings ==
Roof waived his extradition rights and was flown to Sheriff Al Cannon Detention Center in North Charleston on the evening of June 18. At the jail, his cell-block neighbor was Michael Slager, the former North Charleston police officer charged with murder after shooting Walter Scott following a traffic stop. According to unconfirmed reports, Roof confessed to committing the attack and said he wanted to start a race war. He reportedly told investigators he almost did not complete his plan because members of the church group had been so nice to him.

On June 19, Roof was charged with nine counts of murder and one count of possession of a firearm during the commission of a violent crime. He first appeared in Charleston County court via videoconference at a bond hearing later that day. At the hearing, shooting survivors and relatives of five of the victims spoke to Roof directly, saying that they were "praying for his soul" and forgave him.

The judge, Charleston County chief magistrate James "Skip" Gosnell, Jr., said at the bond hearing that, in addition to the dead victims and their families, "there are victims on this young man's side of the family ... Nobody would have ever thrown them into the whirlwind of events that they are being thrown into." The judge was reported to have been reprimanded in 2005 by the South Carolina Supreme Court for using a racial slur while on the bench in 2003.

Gosnell set a $1 million bond for the weapons possession charge and no bail on the nine counts of murder.

Governor Nikki Haley called on prosecutors to seek the death penalty against Roof. In June 2016 she warned against divisive rhetoric, saying that it could lead to tragedies such as the massacre at the church, and referred to the rhetoric of 2016 presidential candidate Donald Trump.

=== Indictment ===
On July 7, Roof was indicted on the nine murder charges and the weapons charge, as well three new charges of attempted murder, one for each person who survived the shooting. He also faced federal hate crime charges, including nine counts of using a firearm to commit murder and 24 civil rights violations (12 hate crime charges and 12 counts of violating a person's freedom of religion), with 18 of the charges carrying the federal death penalty.

On July 31, Roof pleaded not guilty to the federal charges, based on the advice of his lawyer David Bruck. Bruck earlier said Roof wanted to plead guilty, but he couldn't advise it without knowing the government's intentions.

On September 3, Ninth Circuit solicitor (i.e., district attorney) Scarlett Wilson announced that she intended to seek the death penalty against Roof in the state proceedings, based on more than two people being killed in the shooting and others' lives put at risk. On September 16, Roof said through his attorney that he was willing to plead guilty in exchange for a sentence of life in prison without parole.

=== Trial ===
On October 1, the federal trial was pushed back to at least January 2016 to give prosecutors and Roof's attorneys more time to prepare. On December 1, the trial was postponed again to an unknown date. Both Roof and his friend, Joey Meek (who was accused of misprision of felony and lying to investigators about Roof's plans), were to reappear in federal court on February 11, 2016, while their lawyers held a bar meeting with prosecutors to discuss their cases. On November 7, 2016, U.S. District Judge Richard Gergel postponed jury selection until November 9, later postponing the process again until November 21. Gergel later postponed the jury selection to November 28. On November 28, a federal judge granted a motion by Roof to represent himself. On December 4, Roof made a handwritten request of Gergel, asking for his defense team for the guilt phase of his federal death penalty trial. On December 5, 2016, Gergel allowed Roof to hire back his lawyers for the guilt phase of his trial. On December 6, 2016, a federal judge denied a motion by Roof's defense team to delay Roof's trial.

The decision to seek the death penalty for Roof was a campaign topic in the 2016 Democratic presidential primaries, with Hillary Clinton supporting the Justice Department's decision and Bernie Sanders opposing it.

In November 2016, Roof was declared competent to stand trial for the crimes. In January 2017, following a second competency evaluation, Roof was again deemed competent.

Roof's trial began on December 7, 2016; witnesses gave testimony describing the shooting in graphic detail. On December 15, 2016, Roof was found guilty of all 33 federal charges against him. For the sentencing phase of the federal trial, Roof dismissed his attorneys and insisted on representing himself. In a statement to the court at his sentencing hearing on January 4, 2017, Roof offered no apology or explanation, saying "There's nothing wrong with me psychologically." At the hearing, prosecutors introduced into evidence a two-page excerpt from a journal written by Roof from jail six weeks after his arrest, in which Roof composed a white supremacist manifesto, writing: "I would like to make it crystal clear, I do not regret what I did. I am not sorry. I have not shed a tear for the innocent people I killed."

=== Sentence ===
Roof was sentenced to death by the federal court on January 10, 2017, and to life in prison without parole by the state courts on April 10, 2017.

On December 23, 2024, outgoing President Joe Biden announced that he would be granting clemency to 37 out of 40 inmates on federal death row and commute their death sentences to life imprisonment without parole. However, Roof did not receive clemency, because Biden stated that the death penalty should only be reserved for the worst of capital cases, including "cases of terrorism and hate-motivated mass murder".

==== Sentence appeal attempt ====
In January 2020, it was reported that Roof was appealing his death sentence. According to a 321-page brief filed by Roof's lawyers in the U.S. Court of Appeals for the 4th Circuit, Roof's representing himself during the penalty phase of his trial deprived the jury of extenuating information about his mental illness. The brief cites the Supreme Court's ruling in Indiana v. Edwards that judges can force a lawyer on defendants who lack mental capacity.

On May 25, 2021, his lawyers began an appeal process before the United States Court of Appeals for the Fourth Circuit claiming that Roof was "too disconnected from reality" to represent himself at the federal trial. In the 321-page motion, his attorneys argue that he had disorders ranging from schizophrenia spectrum to autism, anxiety and depression, and that he did not care about his sentence, in the belief that white nationalists would rescue him from prison after an impending race war. Roof reportedly had decided he wanted to appeal his death sentence once he realized that the war wasn't going to happen and he wasn't going to be rescued. The defense team reportedly also argued that Roof masked his mental illness during the trial.

On August 25, 2021, a panel of the Fourth Circuit unanimously rejected Roof's appeal. Upholding the death sentence, the judges wrote in their 149-page opinion that "no cold record or careful parsing of statutes and precedents can capture the full horror of what Roof did. His crimes qualify him for the harshest penalty that a just society can impose." On September 10, 2021, his attorneys appealed the judges' ruling.

On September 24, 2021, a federal court declined to take the appeal case against the panel's decision, arguing in a one-page file that the appeals should go before the full appeals court. A day prior, attorneys for the federal government opposed appeals saying that Roof was properly convicted and sentenced saying that there is "no need to revisit" the facts for which Roof was found guilty.

On March 2, 2022, attorneys for Roof announced that they had asked the Supreme Court to resolve the dispute between them and their client over the mental illness defense. Roof had fired his attorneys to prevent them from portraying him as having a mental illness. The attorneys argued that they should have been allowed to remain on the case. On October 11, 2022, it was announced that the Supreme Court had denied the appeal without comment.

== Aftermath ==
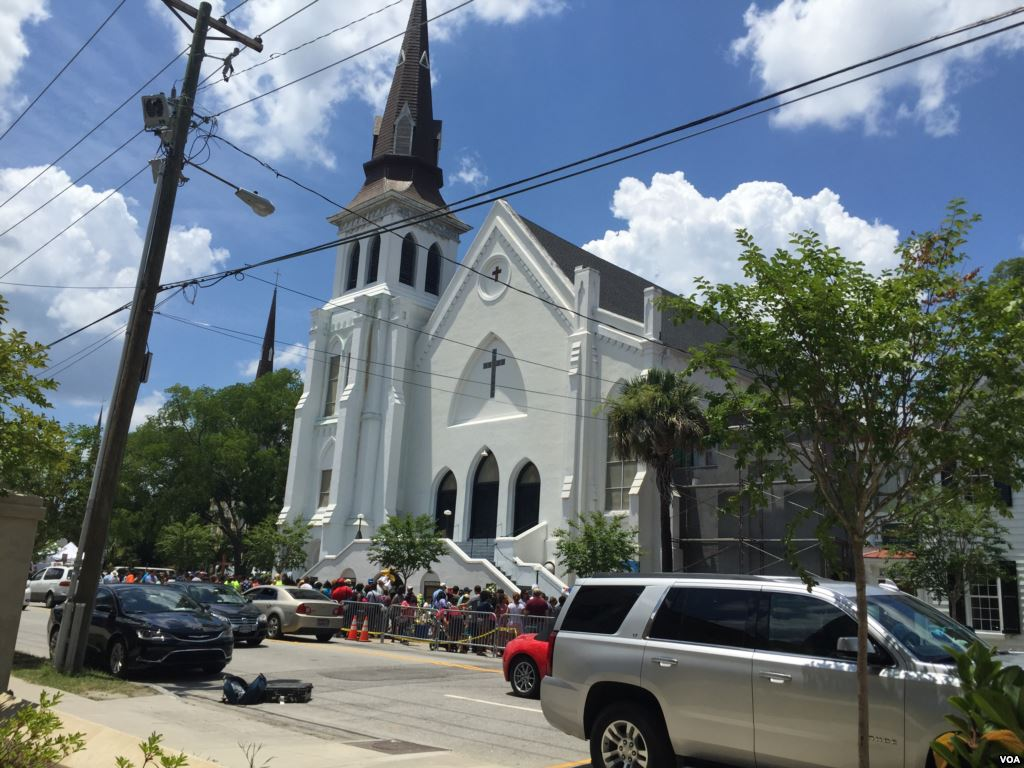
People mourning the deaths at the Emanuel African Methodist Episcopal Church; image taken June 20 (three days post-shooting)

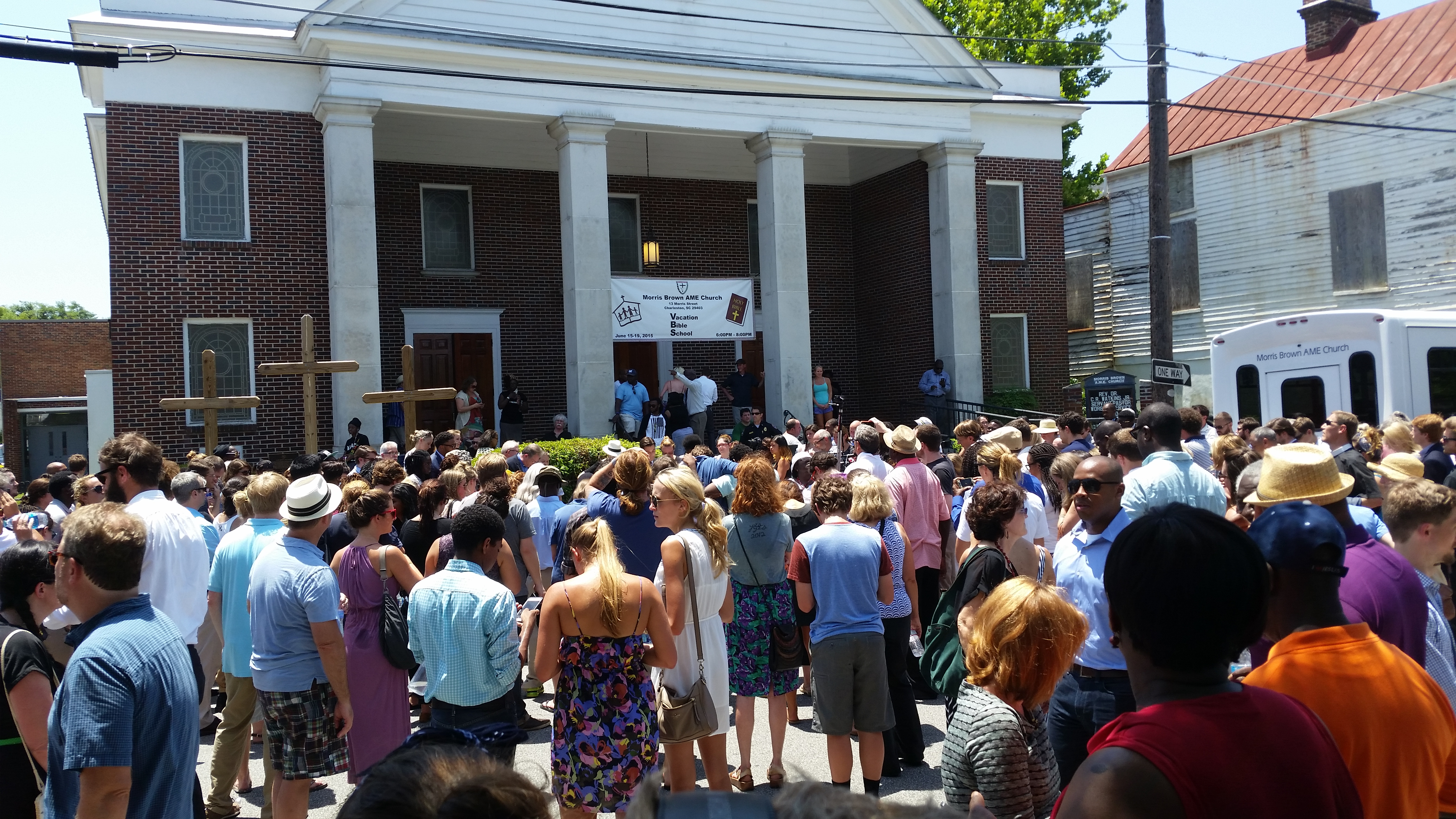
A prayer vigil at Morris Brown African Methodist Episcopal Church

=== Context of racism ===
Heidi Beirich, the director of the Intelligence Project for the Southern Poverty Law Center, a non-profit that seeks to identify American hate groups and confront their activities, said that the gunman's reported motive has frequently appeared on white supremacist websites. They say that "whites are being hugely victimized by blacks and no one is paying attention". Referring to Roof's comments about rape, Beirich said, "[Black men sexually assaulting white women] is probably the oldest racist trope we have in the U.S."

According to Beirich, this trope is related to a myth of Southern culture, because in fact, African-American women had been much more frequently abused by white men. Lisa Lindquist-Dorr, associate professor at the University of Alabama, said that the myth of black rapists had dominated the imaginations of white, Southern men, who believed that "Sexual access to women is a trophy of power, white women embodied virtue and morality, they signified whiteness and white superiority, so sexual access to white women was possessing the ultimate privilege that white men held. It views women as trophies which are to be traded among men."

Jamelle Bouie wrote in Slate, "Make any list of anti-black terrorism in the United States, and you'll also have a list of attacks justified by the specter of black rape." He cited the Tulsa race massacre of 1921, the Rosewood massacre of 1923, and the murder of 14-year-old Emmett Till in 1955 as examples. Beirich said that early in the investigation, it was unclear if the suspect had any connection to hate groups. She noted that "for several years South Carolina has been the place with the highest density of hate groups."

=== Memorials ===
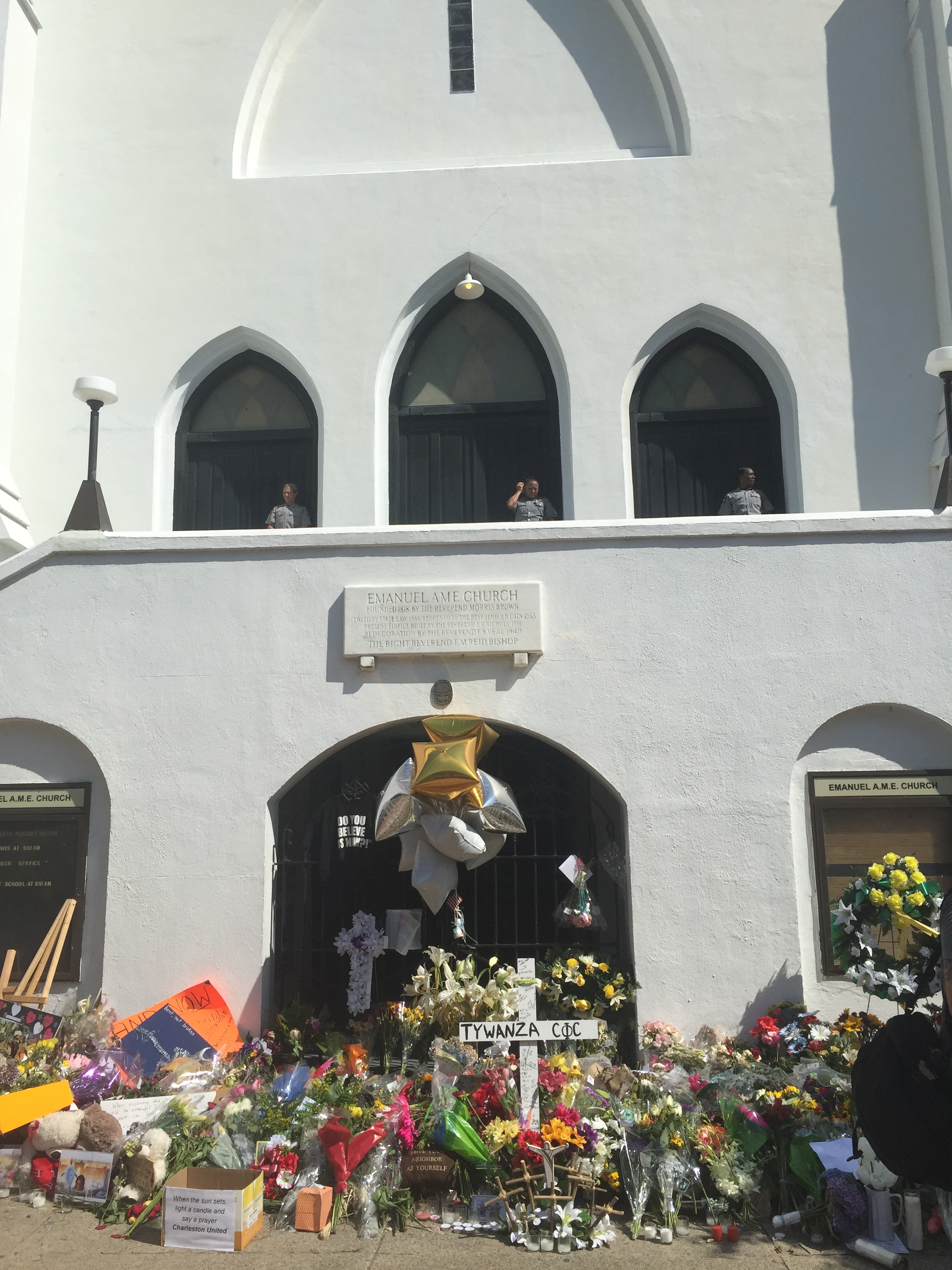
Emanuel African Methodist Episcopal Church, Charleston South Carolina. 21 June 2015

At Morris Brown African Methodist Episcopal Church in Charleston, numerous people of different races and religions attended a ceremony commemorating the victims and they proclaimed that the attack would not divide the community. Another such ceremony occurred at the TD Arena in the College of Charleston. On June 21, four days after the shooting, Emanuel AME Church reopened for its Sunday worship service. The Rev. Dr. Norvel Goff Sr., Presiding Elder of Emanuel AME Church, delivered the sermon.

On June 25, 2015, at Emanuel AME Church, funerals were held for victims Ethel Lance and Sharonda Coleman-Singleton and they were attended by several political figures and civil rights leaders. Clementa Pinckney's funeral was held in the basketball arena of the College of Charleston on June 26, 2015, with President Barack Obama delivering the eulogy. Earlier, Pinckney's body lay in state in the South Carolina State House. This was followed by the funerals of Tywanza Sanders, Susie Jackson, and Cynthia Graham Hurd the next day. Hurd's family announced that they are establishing the Cynthia Graham Hurd Fund for Reading and Literacy organization in her memory; it is expected to give children easier access to books. By July 2, the last of the victims, Daniel Simmons, was buried.

Nine artists from across the United States created portraits of the victims as a tribute to them. The portraits were put on display at the Principle Gallery for one month, and afterwards, they were given to the victims' families. The artists who were involved in the memorial included Ricky Mujica, Mario Andres Robinson, Lauren Tilden, Paul McCormack, Gregory Mortenson, Catherine Prescott, Terry Strickland, Judy Takács, and Stephanie Deshpande.

South Carolina portrait artist Larry Francis Lebby was commissioned to create a portrait of Senator Pinckney after the murders in 2015. The portrait was unveiled in May 2016, and hangs in the South Carolina Senate chambers. Speakers at the unveiling included Senator Gerald Malloy, Representative Joseph Neal, Senate President Hugh Leatherman, Senator John W. Matthews Jr., the widow, Mrs. Jennifer Pinckney, and the artist Larry Lebby himself.

In 2020, Allen University in Columbia, South Carolina announced that their renovation of the Good Samaritan Waverly Hospital would include a memorial that will prominently feature the names of Clementa C. Pinckney and the other eight individuals slain at Emanual African Methodist Episcopal Church in 2015. Pinckney was a graduate of Allen University. Two other Charleston Church Shooting victims, Tywanza Sanders and Rev. Daniel L. Simmons Sr., were also Allen University graduates.

At the 2019 historical marker unveiling at the Dr. Cyril O. Spann Medical Office in Columbia, South Carolina, a planting and dedication ceremony for a Tree of Peace and Resistance held that day in conjunction with the Visanska Starks House recognized actions of mutual support between members of Emanual African Methodist Episcopal Church and Tree of Life – Or L'Simcha Congregation after the Pittsburgh synagogue shooting, and expressed a commitment to public health and non-violence.

In 2025, various activities marked the ten-year anniversary of the Charleston shootings.

A memorial at the church opened on November 14, 2026. Made from marble, it contains a fountain bearing the names of the victims with benches surrounding it. A garden honoring the survivors is also planned.

=== Community's response ===
Some criticism has been aimed towards the community's forgiveness of Roof.

The Black Lives Matter movement has protested against the shooting.

Questions were raised about the security of black churches (as well as the security of churches in general) and their long-standing practice of welcoming anyone who is willing to pray (as most Christian churches are, regardless of the race of the majority of its parishioners). Roof, a stranger to churchgoers, was easily able to enter Emanuel AME Church with no questions asked. In the weeks after the shooting, AME Church leaders distributed a document titled "12 Considerations for Congregational Security", which recommended that they create security plans and teams for black churches, improve communications, develop relationships with local law enforcement, and secure and monitor all entrances to and exits from churches. Some churches considered hiring armed security guards and installing metal detectors, but conversations in support of these steps have currently not gained traction.

=== Other investigations ===
The FBI investigated possible church arson after several black churches burned down in the week following the shooting. On July 3, Time reported that the investigation concluded that the fires were unrelated.

==== Background check failure ====
The FBI underwent a 30-day review to examine the lapses in the background-check system that allowed the suspected shooter to legally purchase the gun used in the shooting. According to James Comey, Roof had been arrested in March on a felony drug charge, which would have required an inquiry into the charge during the background check examination. However, he was actually arrested on a misdemeanor drug charge, which was incorrectly written as a felony at first due to a data entry error made by a jail clerk. The mistake was noticed by the jail two days after the arrest, but the change was not made.

The FBI agent conducting the background check examination then called the wrong agency while making the inquiry into the drug charge, due to having limited information on law enforcement agencies in Lexington County. This subsequently allowed Roof to make the purchase. However, despite the misdemeanor charge, he still should not have been able to purchase the gun under a law that barred anyone who is an "unlawful user of or addicted to any controlled substance" from owning firearms.

Several bills aiming to fix this loophole were proposed, and South Carolina legislation planned to discuss the loophole in 2016. On July 1, 2016, survivors of the shooting sued the FBI for inadvertently enabling Roof to purchase the gun which was used in the shooting. On August 30, 2019, the Fourth Circuit Court of Appeals ruled that the survivors and families of the deceased can sue the Federal government.

==== Joey Meek ====
On September 17, Joey Meek, one of Roof's friends who briefly hid his gun away from him, was arrested, reportedly for lying to federal authorities during their investigation and failing to report a crime. The next day, he pleaded not guilty to one count of making false statements to federal investigators and one count of concealing knowledge about a crime; he admitted he had kept Roof's detailed exposition of his murderous plans to himself, told his friends who believed Roof was the mass killer to not contact the FBI (one of them outright ignored Meek and called an FBI hotline with information that played a crucial role in Roof's arrest), and lied about both these actions to the FBI when questioned. He faced a maximum of nine years in prison and a $500,000 fine. According to legal experts, prosecutors possibly intended to use the prospect of federal charges against him as leverage for his testifying against Roof. Meek pleaded guilty in federal court April 29, 2016. He was sentenced to 27 months in prison in March 2017.

== Reactions ==
=== Officials ===
Charleston Mayor Joseph P. Riley Jr. denounced the attack and said, "Of all cities, in Charleston, to have a horrible hateful person go into the church and kill people there to pray and worship with each other is something that is beyond any comprehension and is not explained. We are going to put our arms around that church and that church family."

South Carolina Governor Nikki Haley said, "While we do not yet know all of the details, we do know that we'll never understand what motivates anyone to enter one of our places of worship and take the life of another. Please join us in lifting up the victims and their families with our love and prayers."

President Barack Obama said in Charleston on June 18, "Once again, innocent people were killed in part because someone who wanted to inflict harm had no trouble getting their hands on a gun... We as a country will have to reckon with the fact that this type of mass violence does not happen in other advanced countries." At a Washington press conference later that day, he said, "Michelle and I know several members of Emanuel AME Church. We knew their pastor, Reverend Clementa Pinckney, who, along with eight others, gathered in prayer and fellowship and was murdered last night. And to say our thoughts and prayers are with them and their families, and their community, doesn't say enough to convey the heartache and the sadness and the anger that we feel."

On June 19, the United States Department of Justice fast-tracked a Crime Victim Assistance Formula Grant of $29 million to the South Carolina government. Some of the money will be allocated to the survivors.

On January 8, 2024, President Joe Biden made a speech at the Emanuel AME Church to talk about the ‘poison’ of white supremacy. Pro-Palestinian protesters interrupted the speech by chanting "ceasefire now". The protests were made in response to the Israel–Palestinian conflict.

=== Families ===
After Roof's appearance at his bond hearing, his family issued a statement, expressing their shock and grief at his actions. Following the funerals of several of the victims in the shooting, they issued a second statement, expressing their condolences to the victims' families and announcing the temporary postponement of comments out of respect for them. During the bond hearing, several family members of the victims told Roof that they forgave him.

=== Local community ===
The local community surrounding Charleston held prayer vigils and fundraisers. A mass unity rally was also held on the Arthur Ravenel Bridge on the evening of June 21. Organizers of the rally claimed there were up to 20,000 supporters in the rally. Tens of thousands of individuals crossed from the Mount Pleasant side of the bridge to the downtown Charleston side, carrying supportive signs and flags. Dozens of boats joined in the procession as well

=== Religious community ===
The World Methodist Council, an association of worldwide churches in the Methodist tradition, of which the AME Church is a part, said it "urges prayer and support for the victims' families and those members of Emanuel African Methodist Episcopal Church who have been so gravely affected by this crime motivated by hate." The President and Vice-President of the British Methodist Conference, also a member of the World Methodist Council, sent a letter of solidarity to the African Methodist Episcopal Church, saying, "The hearts of the members of the Methodist Church of Great Britain go out to the families and friends of those killed; to the Church; and to the wider communities in Charleston."

The Council of Bishops of The United Methodist Church, also a member of the World Methodist Council and in full communion with the African Methodist Episcopal Church, called on its members "to support the victims of this and all acts of violence, to work to end racism and hatred, to seek peace with justice, and to live the prayer that our Lord gave us, that God's 'kingdom come, [and] will be done, on earth as it is in heaven'".

The Christian Methodist Episcopal Church, also a member of the World Methodist Council and in full communion with the African Methodist Episcopal Church, shared its support with the presiding bishop, stating, "let us join with the AMEs in prayer for the healing of the families touched by this tragedy – the families of the victims and the family of the perpetrator".

The Rev. Olav Fykse Tveit, general secretary of the World Council of Churches, said, "We offer our prayers for healing to the wounded and traumatized, and solidarity and accompaniment to our sisters and brothers in the African Methodist Episcopal Church". Archbishop Joseph Edward Kurtz, the president of U.S. Conference of Catholic Bishops, made similar remarks.

On August 8, 2019, the Churchwide Assembly of the Evangelical Lutheran Church in America (ELCA) adopted a resolution to recognize the Emanuel 9 as martyrs on their liturgical calendar and declare June 17 as "a day of repentance in the ELCA for the martyrdom of the Emanuel 9." At the time of the shooting, Dylann Roof was a member of an ELCA congregation. The Rev. Clementa Pinckney and the Rev. Daniel Simmons were both alumni of Lutheran Theological Southern Seminary, a seminary of the ELCA.

Various national Jewish organizations, including the American Jewish Committee, Union for Reform Judaism, Jewish Federations of North America, Anti-Defamation League, and Orthodox Union issued statements deploring the attack and expressing deep grief and horror. The Rabbinical Assembly, in its own statement, quoted Leviticus, saying, "'Do not stand idly by the blood of your neighbor.' Hateful, violent acts such as this have no place in our society, in a country known for its diversity and blending of various cultures."

Many national Muslim organizations and individual imams, such as Council on American–Islamic Relations, Islamic Society of North America (ISNA), and Islamic Circle of North America issued statements condemning the attack and offering sympathy for the victims. In a joint statement, CAIR and Muslim leaders in Baltimore called for a Ramadan 'Day of Prayer' in local communities for healing following on from the Charleston Massacre "Day of Prayer".

Muslim and Jewish religious organizations have raised several hundred thousand dollars to help rebuild black churches that were burned down in the weeks after the shooting.

=== Others ===
At least eighteen candidates and prospective candidates for the 2016 U.S. presidential election expressed reactions through various media and addresses. According to NPR, Democratic and Republican candidates found different ways to address the incident, with Democrats seeing race and gun control as central issues, while Republicans were pointing to mental illness and referring to it as a tragic but random act. Most Republican candidates eventually acknowledged that race was a motivating factor for the shooting. According to The Christian Science Monitor, the shooting became a precarious subject for Republican presidential contenders, in particular in regard of the racial motivations behind it, as South Carolina held primaries and the state's political importance resulted in some candidates "skirting around the clear racial motivations behind the attack".

The night following the attack, Jon Stewart delivered a monologue on The Daily Show discussing the tragic nature of the news, condemning the attack as well as the media's response to it. Stewart argued that in response to Islamic terrorism, politicians declare they will do "whatever we can" to make America safe, even justifying torture, but respond to this mass shooting with "what are you gonna do, crazy is as crazy does".

The Council of Conservative Citizens, whose website Roof cited as a source for his radicalization, issued a statement on its website "unequivocally condemn[ing]" the attack, but that Roof has some "legitimate grievances" against black people. An additional statement from the group's president, Earl Holt III, disavowed responsibility for the crime and said the group's website "accurately and honestly report[s] black-on-white violent crime".

In an online forum, Charles Cotton, a lawyer in Houston and a national board member of the National Rifle Association of America, placed blame for the shooting on Pinckney for not allowing the churchgoers to hold concealed carry weapons inside the church. In 2011, Pinckney had voted against legislation that would allow concealed handguns to be carried into public places. Cotton also criticized the effectiveness of gun-free zones, stating, "If we look at mass shootings that occur, most happen in gun-free zones." Cotton's comment has since been deleted from the online forum.

Following the shooting, Rhodesians Worldwide, an online magazine catering to the Rhodesian expatriate community, issued a brief statement condemning Roof's actions in response to his use of the Rhodesian flag. It said 80% of the Rhodesian Security Forces were black and that the Rhodesian Bush War was a struggle against communism rather than a racial conflict.

Jerry Richardson, the owner of the NFL's Carolina Panthers, donated $100,000 to the Mother Emanuel Hope Fund set up by Mayor Riley, specifically calling for $10,000 to each of the families of the nine victims to cover their funeral expenses, and the remaining $10,000 to be delivered to the Emanuel AME Church itself.

Artist Carrie Mae Weems has created a theater piece in response to the murders, called Grace Notes.

Civil rights advocates said that the Charleston attack did more than fit the dictionary definition of terrorism because it also reflected the history of attempts to terrorize African-Americans by the Ku Klux Klan and other white supremacist groups.

=== Retaliatory attack ===
On September 24, 2017, Emanuel K. Samson, shot up a church that killed a woman and wounded seven others as retaliation for the Charleston shooting. The perpetrator, who is black, reportedly said that he wanted to "kill 10 white people" and referenced Roof and the Pan-African flag in a note he left in his car.

== Consequences ==
=== Confederate flag ===
The battle flag of the Confederate States of America

On June 18, 2015, the day after the shooting, many flags, including those at the South Carolina State House, were flown at half-staff. The Confederate battle flag flying over the South Carolina Confederate Monument near the state house was not lowered, as South Carolina law prohibited alteration of the flag without the consent of two-thirds of the state legislature. Additionally, the flagpole lacked a pulley system, meaning the flag could not be flown at half-staff, only removed.

==== Flag's removal from statehouse grounds ====
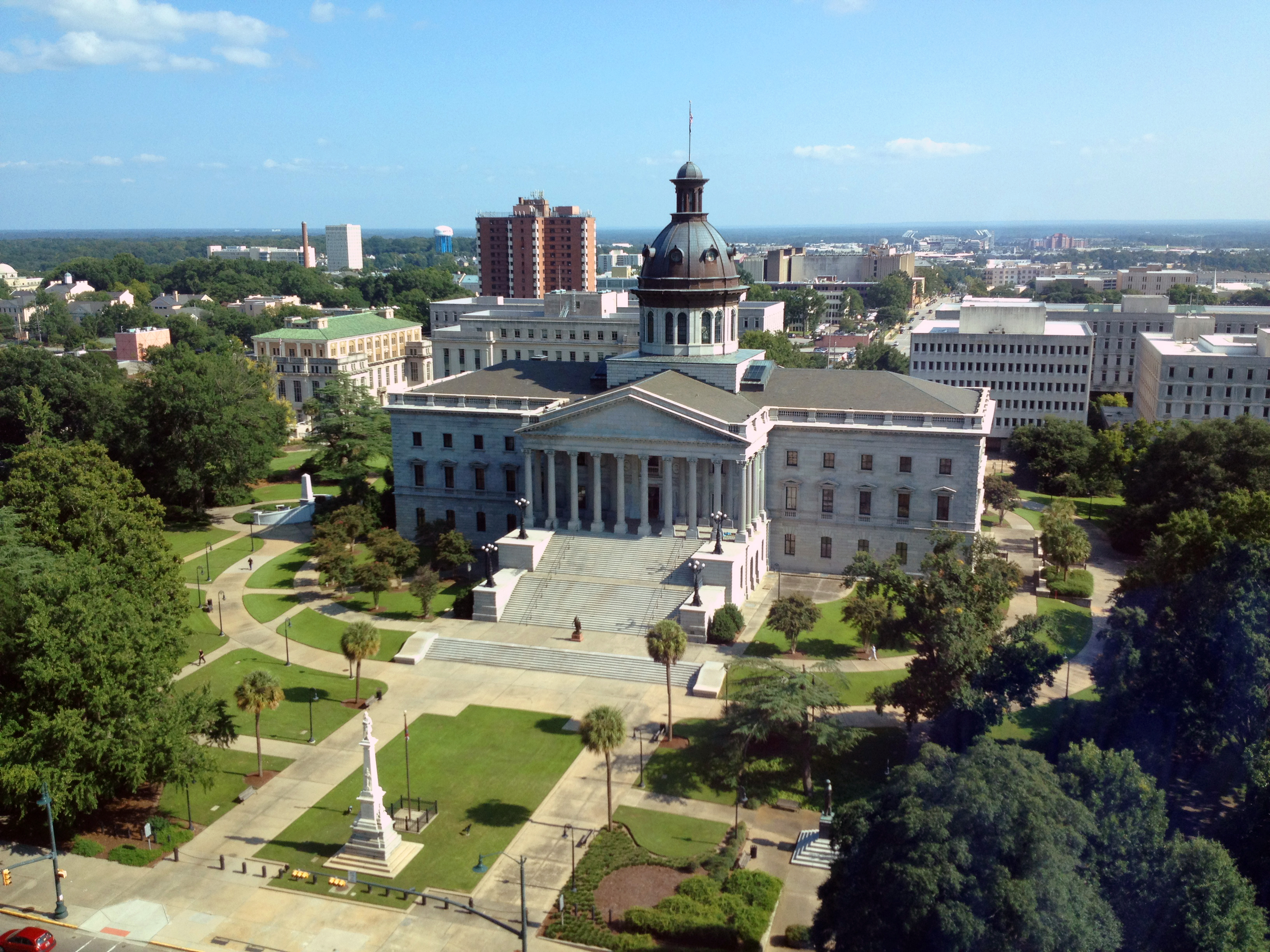
South Carolina State House with the Confederate Monument in front, flag at rest

Calls to remove the Confederate flag from statehouse grounds, as well as debates over the context of its symbolic nature, were renewed after the attack by several prominent figures, including President Barack Obama, Mitt Romney, and Jeb Bush. On June 20, 2015, several thousand people gathered in front of the South Carolina State House in protest. An online petition at MoveOn.org encouraging the flag's removal had received over 370,000 signatures by that time.

At a statehouse press conference on June 22, Governor Nikki Haley, flanked by elected officials of both parties, including U.S. Republican senators Lindsey Graham and Tim Scott, and former Republican Governor Mark Sanford, called for the flag to be removed by the state legislature, saying that while the flag was "an integral part of our past, it does not represent the future" of South Carolina. Eulogizing the Rev. Clementa Pinckney on June 26, 2015, before 5,000 congregants at the College of Charleston, President Barack Obama acknowledged that the shooting had catalyzed a broad movement, backed by Republicans and Democrats, to remove the flag from official public display. "Blinded by hatred, [the gunman] failed to comprehend what Reverend Pinckney so well understood: the power of God's grace," Obama said. "By taking down that flag we express God's grace. But I don't think God wants us to stop there."

On July 6, 2015, the South Carolina Senate voted to remove the Confederate flag from display outside the South Carolina State House. Following 13 hours of debate, the vote in the House to remove it was passed by a two-thirds majority (94–20) on July 9. Governor Nikki Haley signed the bill on July 9. On July 10, the Confederate flag was taken down for the last time; it will be stored until it can later be shown in a museum.

==== Retailers end sales of the flag ====
On June 23, 2015, retailers Wal-Mart, Amazon.com, Sears Holding Corporation (which owns Sears and Kmart), and eBay all announced plans to stop selling merchandise with the Confederate flag. Similarly, Warner Bros. announced they were halting production of "General Lee" car toys, which prominently feature a Confederate flag on the roof. Many major flag manufacturers also decided to stop profiting from the flag.

=== Removal of Confederate monuments and memorials ===
The city of New Orleans has announced plans to remove four memorials related to the Confederacy. Two of them, the Battle of Liberty Place Monument and the Jefferson Davis Monument, have been removed as of May 11, 2017.

=== Other ===
In reaction to the controversy regarding the Confederate flag's modern display, institutions across the U.S. have considered removing the names of historic Confederate figures from schools, colleges, and streets. Campaigns to change the names were started in several cities.

In a national survey which was conducted in 2015, 57% of Americans opined that the Confederate flag represented Southern pride rather than racism. A previous poll which was conducted in 2000 had a nearly identical result of 59%. However, poll results which were only collected from citizens who were living in the South yielded different results: 75% of whites described the flag as a symbol of pride, while 75% of blacks said that the flag represented racism.

=== Earl Holt's political donations ===
Earl Holt, the leader of the Council of Conservative Citizens, whose website Roof credited for shaping his views in his manifesto, gave more than $74,000 to Republican candidates and committees in recent years, including campaign donations to 2016 presidential candidates Ted Cruz, Rick Santorum, and Rand Paul, who have all condemned Roof's racially based motives. Following the shooting, and after a journalist contacted the campaigns with details about the donor's background, a spokesman for the Ted Cruz campaign said that he would return an $8,500 donation to Holt; the campaign later said that it would donate $11,000 to the Mother Emanuel Hope Fund, to assist the victims' families. The Rand Paul campaign said Holt's $2,250 donation would be given to the Fund, and Rick Santorum said his $1,500 donation from Holt would be donated to the same charity. Twelve other Republican office-holders also announced they would be returning or donating Holt's contributions.

=== "Terrorism" terminology ===
While some media professionals, politicians and law enforcement officials referred to the attack as an act of domestic terrorism, others did not. This renewed a debate about the terminology which people should use whenever they describe the shooting and other attacks.

On June 18, professor and terrorism expert Brian Phillips offered his definition of terrorism by saying, the shooting was "clearly a terrorist act". He based this conclusion on a racist political motivation that "seems likely" and his "intimidation of a wider audience" criterion was met when "... the shooter reportedly left one person alive to spread the message". An article by CNN National Security Analyst Peter Bergen and David Sterman on June 19 says, "By any reasonable standard, this is terrorism, which is generally defined as an act of violence against civilians by individuals or organizations for political purposes. ... [D]eadly acts of terrorism by virulent racists and anti-government extremists have been more common in the United States than deadly acts of jihadist terrorism since 9/11."

Some publications and their analyses of the event said that these naming discrepancies reflect either forms of denial or outright racism. The journalist Glenn Greenwald wrote that

Almost immediately, news reports indicated that there was 'no sign of terrorism' – by which they meant: it does not appear that the shooter is Muslim ... other than the perpetrator’s non-Muslim identity, the Charleston attack from the start had the indicia of what is commonly understood to be 'terrorism'. (emphasis in original)

Speaking at a press conference in Baltimore on June 19, FBI Director James Comey said, while his agency was investigating the shooting as a "hate crime", he did not consider it an "act of terrorism", citing the lack of political motivation for the suspect's actions. He said, "Terrorism is act of violence done or threatened in order to try to influence a public body or citizenry, so it's more of a political act, and again, based on what I know, I don't see this as a political act. Doesn't make it any less horrific, but terrorism has a definition under federal law."

Heidi Beirich, who leads the Intelligence Project at the Southern Poverty Law Center (SPLC), pointed to the discovery of a website attributed to Roof, which featured a manifesto and sixty photos as an example of why federal agents "don't have themselves together on this issue". The website began circulating on the Internet on June 20. Beirich said, "The way they found the website was that someone ran a domain tool reverse search on this guy's name... It wasn't rocket science, but where were the feds?"

On June 24, FBI spokesman Paul Bresson left the possibility of terrorism charges open, saying, "Any eventual federal charges will be determined by the facts at the conclusion of the investigation, and are not influenced by how the investigation is initially opened." Ultimately, it is up to Department of Justice prosecutors to decide what federal charges to bring. A spokesperson for Attorney General Loretta Lynch said the Department of Justice was investigating the shooting as both "a hate crime and as an act of domestic terrorism."

=== Imitators and subculture ===
The infamy of Roof and the shooting has inspired imitators to plot similar attacks or commit crimes under motives influenced by his actions. Benjamin Thomas Samuel McDowell was arrested in 2017 for unlawful firearm possession; he had been planning to shoot up the Temple Emanu-El synagogue in Myrtle Beach, South Carolina, while Elizabeth Lecron and Vincent Armstrong were arrested for plotting to use explosives to commit "upscale mass murder" in Toledo, Ohio, having previously corresponded with Roof himself.

Benjamin McDowell was sentenced to 33 months in federal prison in 2018 and was released in 2019, but was re-arrested in 2022 for violating the conditions of his supervised release. In 2019, Lecron and Armstrong were sentenced to 15 years and 6 years, respectively.

A violent neo-Nazi subculture which glorifies Roof and other far-right mass murderers has also emerged, and it is known as the "Bowl Gang" or the "Bowl Patrol", referring to Roof's distinctive bowl haircut.

Payton Gendron, the perpetrator of the 2022 Buffalo shooting, wrote "Dylann Roof" on his weapon.

In June 2015, Daniel Craven, a prisoner who was serving a life sentence at Florida's Graceville Correctional Facility for the 2011 murder of his romantic rival, used a homemade shank to stab and kill his African-American cellmate John Anderson. According to Craven, he wanted to make use of Anderson's death to inspire and start a racial war between prisoners of different races, and his motive was partly influenced by the actions of Dylann Roof and the Charleston shootings. Craven was ultimately convicted of first-degree murder and sentenced to death in June 2018.

== Lawsuits ==
On October 29, 2021, the Justice Department agreed to pay $88 million to the families of the victims and the wounded. The settlement comes about after relatives of the victims sued the FBI because it had a faulty background check system, which allowed Roof to purchase the gun that he used in the shooting. The relatives of the deceased will receive $6m and $7.5m while five other people who sustained injuries will each receive $5 million.

== See also ==
- African-American history
- African Americans in South Carolina
- 16th Street Baptist Church bombing (1963)
- Far-right politics#United States
- Post–civil rights era in African-American history
- Racial segregation of churches in the United States
- Racism against African Americans
- Racism in the United States
- Radical right (United States)
- Right-wing terrorism
- White nationalism#United States
- White supremacy#United States
