= Daniel Craven =

Daniel Craven may refer to:

- Danie Craven (1910–1993), South African rugby union player, coach, administrator, academic, and author
- Daniel Craven (murderer) (born 1986), American convicted murderer
- Danny Craven (rugby league) (born 1991), English rugby league player

== See also ==
- Danny Craven (born 1967), Australian rules footballer
- Dan Craven (born 1983), Namibian racing cyclist
