= Claude Wilkinson =

American poet and artist

- Born: December 17, 1959 (age 66); Memphis, Tennessee, U.S.
- Education: University of Mississippi; University of Memphis
- Writing career
- Genre: Poetry

Claude Wilkinson (born Memphis, Tennessee) is an American poet and artist.

== Life ==
He graduated from the University of Mississippi and University of Memphis. He was writer-in-residence at the University of Mississippi.

His work has appeared in Atlanta Review, Blue Mesa Review, California State Poetry Quarterly, Chattahoochee Review, The Oxford American, Poem, South Dakota Review, The Southern Review and Xavier Review. His paintings have been exhibited at University of Mississippi.

He lives in Nesbit, Mississippi.

== Awards ==
- 2000 Whiting Award
- 1999 Walter E. Dakin Fellowship in Poetry from the Sewanee Writers' Conference
- 1997 Naomi Long Madgett Poetry Award

== Works ==
- Reading the Earth: Poems. Michigan State University Press. 1998. ISBN 978-0-87013-481-4.
- Joy in the Morning. LSU Press. 2004. ISBN 978-0-8071-3006-3.
- Marvelous Light

=== Anthologies ===
- E. Ethelbert Miller, ed. (2002). Beyond the frontier: African-American poetry for the 21st century. Black Classic Press. ISBN 978-1-57478-017-8.
- C. E. Greer; Jenny Kander, eds. (2007). "White Horses". Say This of Horses. University of Iowa Press. ISBN 978-1-58729-526-3.
- Evensong: contemporary American poets on spirituality (Bottom Dog Press, 2006) ISBN 978-1-933964-01-0
- Fresh Water (Pudding House Publications, 2002)
