= Townsville Herald =

The Townsville Herald was a newspaper published in Townsville, Queensland, Australia. It was also known as North Queensland Herald, Cleveland Bay Express and Northern Advertiser, and Townsville Times and North Queensland Advertiser.

== History ==
The Cleveland Bay Herald and Northern Pioneer came into existence on 3 March 1866, by James Thornburn Brown and published by a Mr Bohm, before shortly afterwards, changed to the Cleveland Bay Express, conducted by John Melton Black.

The Townsville Herald was published from 1876 to 5 August 1891. Archibald Meston became the editor of the paper in May 1881. This became part of libel action where Meston felt another newspaper's article suggested he was subservient to John Macrossan regarding proprietorship. The Herald was floated as a company in 1882.

With the formation of the Townsville Newspaper Company in 1884, the Herald was acquired, and later merged into the Townsville Daily Bulletin. It would appear as the North Queensland Herald.
