= Power100 =

Coordinates: 19°16′08.93″S 146°46′54.15″E

Townsville, Queensland; Australia
- Broadcast area: Townsville
- Frequency: 100.7 MHz

Programming
- Language: English
- Format: Active rock

Ownership
- Owner: ARN; (Radio Barrier Reef Pty Ltd)
- Sister stations: Star 106.3

Links
- Website: power100.com.au

Power100 (callsign 4RGR) is a commercial Australian station based in Townsville, Queensland, owned by ARN.

== History ==
Power100 was established as Sea FM in 1999 by RG Capital, headed by Reg Grundy. In 2003, the station was sold alongside sister station Mix FM (now Star 106.3) to Macquarie Southern Cross Media, owners of rivals 4TO FM and Hot FM. However, Macquarie was forced to sell two stations to ensure diversity in the market, and in 2005 Mix FM and Sea FM were sold to Prime Media Group.

In 2013, Prime Media Group sold its radio division to Grant Broadcasters.

In 2016, the station rebranded from Zinc 100.7 to Power100.

In November 2021, Power100, along with other stations owned by Grant Broadcasters, were acquired by the Australian Radio Network. This deal allows Grant's stations, including Power100, to access ARN's iHeartRadio platform in regional areas. The deal was finalized on 4 January 2022. It is expected Power100 will integrate with ARN's Pure Gold Network, but will retain its current name according to the press release from ARN.

== See also ==
- Media in Townsville
