= Media in Townsville =

Townsville is a city on the north-eastern coast of Queensland, Australia, with four commercial radio stations, four narrowcast radio stations, three community radio stations, five Australian Broadcasting Corporation (ABC) radio stations, three commercial television stations, a regional daily newspaper and a community weekly newspaper. There are no local Sunday papers although the Sunday Mail (based in Brisbane) publishes a North Queensland edition, which is printed and distributed from Townsville (throughout Northern Queensland). Townsville also has extensive outdoor and indoor advertising media, ranging from taxi advertising to large-format billboards.

== Print media ==
The Townsville Bulletin is the only newspaper in Townsville, with daily coverage on local, state, national and world news, with sections and liftouts on health, real estate, youth, beauty, cars and lifestyle. The Bulletin is in tabloid format.

HUXLEY Press is a regional online music, arts and creative culture street press. 5,000 copies (with a readership of approximately 15,000) are distributed via galleries, theatres, performing arts groups, retail outlets, hotels, secondary and tertiary education campuses in Townsville, Hinchinbrook, Charters Towers and the Shire of Burdekin.

Magnetic Island has two competing small publications; Magnetic Island Community News is printed weekly and Magnetic Times is published online.

The North Queensland Register is based in Townsville. However, it services the Queensland rural community from Rockhampton North. Owned by Rural Press Limited, it has a distribution of about 5,000.

Northern Services Courier is an independent newspaper for Australian Defence Force personnel stationed in Townsville.

The Hack (formerly known as The Bullsheet) is the student community newspaper at James Cook University, published by the JCU Student Association. Outlook is the academic community newspaper at the university and it is published by the University.

Broadcast centre for Triple M & hit103.1. Also houses the news crew from 10 News.

== Radio ==
Station	Frequency	
ABC North Queensland	630 AM	Government funded
RadioTAB	891 AM	Racing/Narrowcast
Classic Gold FM	87.6 FM	Oldies/Narrowcast
Vision Radio Network	88.0 FM	Christian/Narrowcast
ABC News Radio	94.3 FM and 93.5 FM	Government funded
Hot Country	98.9 FM	Country/Narrowcast
Live FM	99.9 FM	Community
Power100	100.7 FM	Commercial
ABC Classic FM	101.5 FM and 95.9 FM	Government funded
Triple M Townsville	102.3 FM	Commercial
Hit 103.1	103.1 FM	Commercial
4TTT	103.9 FM	Community
ABC Radio National	104.7 FM and 96.7 FM	Government funded
Triple J	105.5 FM and 97.5 FM	Government funded
Star 106.3	106.3 FM	Commercial
4K1G	107.1 FM	Indigenous/Community
Townsvillerocks.com	townsvillerocks.com	Online

== Television ==
All three main commercial networks produce local news coverage – Seven Queensland and WIN Television both air 30-minute local news bulletins at 6pm each weeknight, produced from newsrooms in the city but broadcast from studios in Maroochydore and Wollongong respectively. Network 10 airs short regional 10 News updates throughout the day, broadcast from Hobart.

National and international news bulletins are shown on each respective network in place of or following local news – four are produced in Brisbane, with a Queensland focus (ABC, Seven, Nine and 10). The Brisbane edition of 10 News also employs a North Queensland reporter based in Townsville, covering roughly from the tip of Cape York South to Mackay.

Official Name	Name	Other Info
ABQ	ABC Queensland	Known as the ABC
STQ	Seven Queensland	Owned and operated by Seven Network
RTQ	WIN Television	Nine Network affiliate
TNQ	Network 10	Owned and operated by Network 10
SBS	SBS Television	Known as SBS

New channels broadcast by all the networks in addition to the ones listed above are available on Freeview Australia to viewers in Townsville and the surrounding region. These channels include ABC Kids, ABC Family, ABC Entertains, ABC News, SBS2, SBS World Movies, SBS Food, SBS WorldWatch, NITV, 10 Drama, 10 Comedy, Nickelodeon, 7two, 7mate, 7flix, 7Bravo, 9Gem, 9Go! and 9Life.

== Internet ==
Currently the only major local producer of online journalism is ABC North Queensland.
