= Rhodesians Worldwide =

- Editors: Chris & Annette Whitehead
- Former editors: Peter & Julia Hagelthorn
- Frequency: Quarterly
- Founder: Geoff Hill
- Founded: 1984; 41 years ago
- Country: United States
- Based in: Arizona
- Language: English
- Website: rhodesians-worldwide.com

Rhodesians Worldwide is a quarterly contact magazine for former Rhodesian citizens and other people who desire to maintain a link with Rhodesia. It is distributed in 60 countries. It is affiliated with many other Rhodesian diaspora organisations, in the UK, RSA, Australia and New Zealand.

The magazine's editorial staff maintain contact with several worldwide Rhodesian organisations. They are dedicated to preserving the history of Rhodesia and her people. In 2008, the quarterly was cited in a dissertation by a student of the University of Helsinki.

== History ==
The magazine was founded in Australia by Geoff Hill in approximately 1984. Its base was moved to the United Kingdom ca. 1986, when Peter and Julia Hagelthorn became its editors. In 1998 Chris and Annette Whitehead took over as editors, basing the magazine in the United States.
