= 4K1G =

Indigenous Australian radio station

Coordinates: 19°15′42″S 146°48′48″E

4K1G (4KIG)
- Townsville, Queensland; Australia
- Broadcast area: Townsville RA2
- Frequency: 107.1 MHz

Programming
- Format: Indigenous and community radio

Ownership
- Owner: Townsville Aboriginal and Torres Strait Islander Corporation for Media

Technical information
- Licensing authority: ACMA
- ERP: 16 kW

Links
- Public licence information: Profile
- Website: www.4k1g.org

4K1G is an Indigenous Australian radio station based in Townsville, Queensland. The station is aimed at the Aboriginal and Torres Strait Islander people but plays a wide selection of music, news, sport and talk radio that appeals to the whole community.

== See also ==
- Media in Townsville
