= Geoff Hill (South African journalist) =

South African journalist

Geoffrey Rex Alexander Middleton Hill is a journalist and author working in London, Nairobi and Johannesburg. When not on assignment, his home is in Warwickshire, England.

== Biography ==
Hill spent his childhood in Malawi, Rhodesia, and South Africa.

His father, Hugh Middleton Hill, was federal water engineer for Nyasaland, during the Federation of Rhodesia and Nyasaland, and went on to establish water projects across southern Africa. Geoff went to a total of 12 schools before completing his education at Northlands Boys' High School in Durban.

His early writing for biology journals and poetry magazines was encouraged by his mother Zaeta. After school, he studied zoology at the University of Natal.

In 1982 he moved to Australia and worked on various newspapers including the Townsville Bulletin and The Australian. In 1992, with Nick Russell, he co-founded African Safari Magazine which ceased publication in 2000. He married Hope Kleoudis in Sydney in 1995 and they moved to Zimbabwe in 1997.

From 2002 until 2010, Hill worked as East and Southern Africa bureau chief for The Washington Times.

In 2009, Hill began serving on the panel of the International Association of Genocide Scholars’ advisory council, the first African to do so.

== Publications ==
=== Articles and op-eds ===
- OP-ED: Where nobody speaks out, murder becomes the norm (2018, The Daily Maverick)

=== Published works ===
- The Battle for Zimbabwe (Zebra Press, 2003)
- What Happens After Mugabe? (2005) (ISBN 978-1770071025)

== Awards ==
- 2000: John Steinbeck Short Story Award
