= Mary Blair =

American artist, animator, and designer

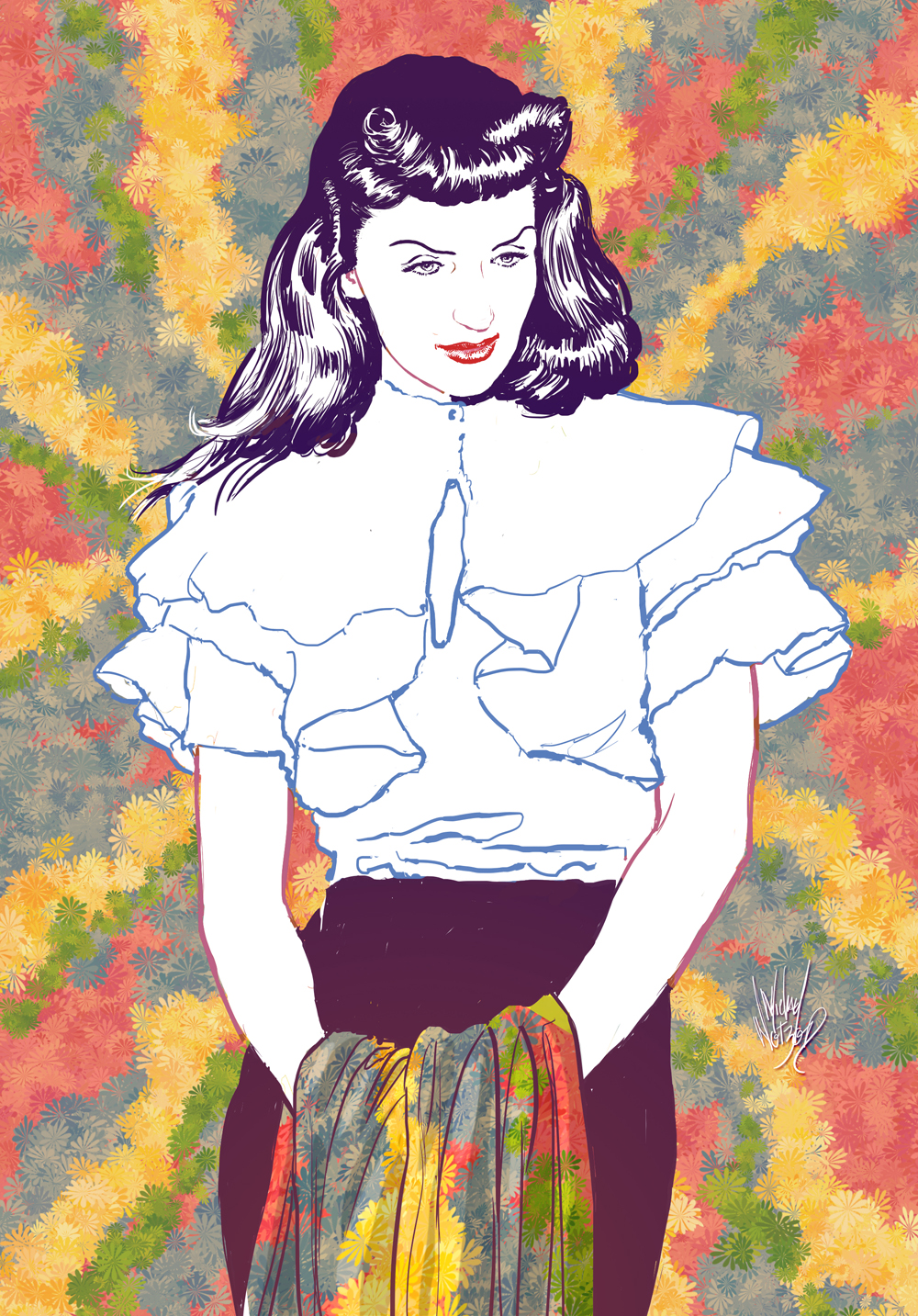
- Mary Blair by Michael Netzer
- Born: Mary Browne Robinson; October 21, 1911; McAlester, Oklahoma, U.S.
- Died: July 26, 1978 (aged 66); Soquel, California, U.S.
- Education: San Jose State University; Chouinard Art Institute
- Employer: Walt Disney Productions (1940–1953)
- Known for: Artwork made for The Walt Disney Company
- Works: Alice in Wonderland; Peter Pan; Song of the South; Cinderella; Make Mine Music
- Movement: Modernism
- Spouse: Lee Everett Blair (m. 1934)
- Relatives: Preston Blair (brother-in-law)
- Awards: Disney Legend Award; Winsor McCay Award

Mary Blair (born Mary Browne Robinson; October 21, 1911 – July 26, 1978) was an American artist, illustrator, animation concept artist, colorist, designer, and writer. She was prominent in producing art for The Walt Disney Company, drawing concept art for such films as Alice in Wonderland, Peter Pan, Song of the South, and Cinderella. Blair also created character designs for enduring attractions such as Disneyland's It's a Small World, the fiesta scene in El Rio del Tiempo in the Mexico pavilion in Epcot's World Showcase, and an enormous mosaic inside Disney's Contemporary Resort. Several of her illustrated children's books from the 1950s remain in print, such as I Can Fly by Ruth Krauss. Blair was inducted into the group of Disney Legends in 1991.

== Early life ==
Born on October 21, 1911, in McAlester, Oklahoma, Mary Browne Robinson moved to Texas while still a small child, and later to the city of Morgan Hill, California, in the early 1920s. After graduating from San Jose State University, which she attended from 1929 to 1931, Mary won a scholarship to the Chouinard Art Institute in Los Angeles, where artists such as Pruett Carter, Morgan Russell, and Lawrence Murphy were among the teachers. She graduated from Chouinard in 1933. In 1934 shortly after college, she married another artist, Lee Everett Blair (October 1, 1911 – April 19, 1993). She was the sister-in-law of animator Preston Blair (1908–1995). Along with her husband Lee, she became a member of the California School of Watercolor and quickly became known for being an imaginative colorist and designer.

== Career ==
Blair's first professional job in the animation industry was as in the animation unit of Metro-Goldwyn-Mayer. She left to join Lee Blair at the Ub Iwerks Studio before moving to Disney. In the 1930s, she was also a part of the innovative California Water-Color Society.

Blair joined Walt Disney Productions—initially with some reluctance— in 1940, and worked briefly on art for Dumbo, an early version of Lady and the Tramp, and "Baby Ballet", a segment for an proposed sequel to Fantasia. After some time, Blair decided to leave the studio in 1941, feeling artistically restrained and unsatisfied with the work given to her.

After being away from the studio for a short time, Blair traveled to various South American countries with Walt Disney, Lillian Disney, and other artists on a research tour as part of the Good Neighbor policy of President Franklin D. Roosevelt. While on the tour, Blair was able to capture a variety of distinct South American sceneries and people in her own style. Her use of color and shape impressed Disney, who appointed her as an art supervisor for the animated feature films Saludos Amigos and The Three Caballeros. Blair's various paintings of children she had met on the trip were later used as concept art and inspiration for Disneyland's It's a Small World attraction.

Blair first began animation and color design on major films in 1943 and continued to work on animated films for Disney for a full decade. This was not widely celebrated by others though, as many animators who worked alongside her had trouble bringing her two-dimensional paintings to life, and many seemed confused on her unique use of colors. Despite this, her work with animation did not end there; after that, she worked on several package films, excluding Fun and Fancy Free, and on two partially animated features—Song of the South and So Dear to My Heart. The early 1950s were a busy time for the Disney studio, with an animated feature released nearly every year. Mary Blair was credited with color styling on Cinderella (1950), Alice in Wonderland (1951), and Peter Pan (1953), and the artistic influence of her concept art is strongly felt in those films, as well as in several animated shorts, including Susie the Little Blue Coupe and The Little House, that she designed during that period. Some of Mary Blair's work, notably in So Dear to My Heart, was inspired by quilts. In a letter to Walt Disney, Blair discussed her interest to incorporate quilts into So Dear to My Heart: "It seems that quilt making is a revived art in this country now, which fact adds more value to its use as a medium of expression in our picture."

After the completion of Peter Pan, Blair resigned from Disney and worked as a freelance graphic designer and illustrator, creating advertising campaigns for companies such as Nabisco, Pepsodent, Maxwell House, Beatrice Foods, and others. She also illustrated several Little Golden Books for publisher Simon & Schuster, some of which remain in print today, and she also designed Christmas and Easter sets for Radio City Music Hall. Blair not only worked in graphic design and animation, but also as a designer for Bonwit Teller and created theatrical sets.

At the request of Walt Disney, who regarded highly her innate sense of color styling, Blair began work on Disney's new attraction, It's a Small World. Originally a Pepsi-Cola-sponsored pavilion benefiting UNICEF at the 1964 New York World's Fair, the attraction moved to Disneyland after the fair closed and was later replicated at the Magic Kingdom in Walt Disney World Resort, as well as Tokyo Disneyland, Disneyland Paris, and Hong Kong Disneyland. Although this attraction has received both criticisms and embrace, Blair's bold use of shape, color, and cultural motifs continue to be recognized and celebrated.

Blair created murals that were showcased in Disney parks, hotels, and other Disney attractions from California to Florida. These murals were not only painted, but some also were tile decor (mosaic).

In 1966, philanthropist Dr. Jules Stein hired Walt Disney to create a ceramic mural for his newly opened Eye Institute at the University of California, Los Angeles. Mary Blair designed the mural for Dr. Stein's Pediatric Surgery waiting room. The theme Walt chose for the mural was that of It's a Small World attraction designed by Blair. In 1967, Blair created mural art for the Tomorrowland Promenade. Two similar tile murals flanked the entrance corridor. The mural over Adventure Thru Inner Space was covered over in 1987 with the opening of Star Tours, while the other remained in place until 1998, when the Circle-Vision 360° was replaced by Rocket Rods and a new mural was designed to reflect the new theme. Her design of a 90-foot-high (27 m) mural remains a focal point of the Disney's Contemporary Resort hotel at Walt Disney World, which was completed for the resort's opening in 1971.

Mary Blair also went on to make sets of Walt Disney note cards for Hallmark. In 1968, Blair was credited as color designer on the film adaptation of How to Succeed in Business Without Really Trying. Blair eventually moved to Washington, DC, for Lee Blair's military career and then returned to her in home studio located on Long Island, New York.

== Filmography ==
Films on which Mary Blair worked include:

- How to Succeed in Business Without Really Trying (1967)
- Lady and the Tramp (1955) (uncredited)
- Peter Pan (1953)
- The Little House (1952)
- Susie the Little Blue Coupe (1952)
- Alice in Wonderland (1951)
- Cinderella (1950)
- The Adventures of Ichabod and Mr. Toad (1949) ("The Legend of Sleepy Hollow" segment)
- So Dear to My Heart (1948)
- Melody Time (1948; "Once Upon a Wintertime" and "The Legend of Johnny Appleseed" segments)
- Song of the South (1946)
- Make Mine Music (1946)
- The Three Caballeros (1944)
- Saludos Amigos (1942)
- Dumbo (1941)
- Fantasia (1940)

Blair was also a writer for:

- Walt Disney's Wonderful World of Color
- Once Upon a Wintertime

== Death and cultural legacy ==
Mary Blair moved back to California and died of a cerebral hemorrhage in Soquel, California, on July 26, 1978, aged 66. Her death was likely brought on by acute alcoholism.

In 1991, she was honored as a Disney Legend. Also posthumously, she received the Winsor McCay Award from ASIFA-Hollywood in 1996, along with two other Disney animators.

While the fine art she created outside of her association with Disney and her work as an illustrator is not widely known, Blair's bold and groundbreaking color design still inspires many of today's contemporary designers and animators. A Google doodle was created on Friday, October 21, 2011, to commemorate the centennial of her birth. The doodle featured an image of an illustrator as Mary might have drawn herself, surrounded by the simple patterns and shapes that made up her familiar cartoon world. Simon & Schuster published Pocket Full of Colors, a picture book biography about Mary Blair, in August 2017. The book is written by Amy Guglielmo and Jacqueline Tourville, and illustrated by Brigette Baranger, who once worked as an artist at Disney.

Mary Blair has been credited with introducing modernist art styles to Walt Disney and his studio by using primary colors to form intense contrast and colors that are unnatural to the image they are depicting.

Blair's artwork was exhibited in The Colors of Mary Blair at the Museum of Contemporary Art, Tokyo, July 2009. From March 13 to September 7, 2014, the Magic, Color, Flair: The World of Mary Blair exhibition was on display at the Walt Disney Family Museum in San Francisco Presidio, California.

In 2022, a mural of Blair was unveiled in her hometown of McAlester, Oklahoma. Painted by local artist Carmen Taylor, the mural depicts Blair surrounded by fantastical vines and a gold stopwatch, references to Cinderella (1950) and Alice in Wonderland (1951), respectively. The mural is on the side of the Honey Beene Boutique in downtown McAlester.

A visual representation of Blair is in Disneyland's It's a Small World ride; she is rendered as a little girl halfway up the Eiffel Tower, holding a balloon.

Since 2015, literary journal Reed Magazine (headquartered at Blair's alma mater San Jose State University) has exhibited the Mary Blair Award for Art, awarding visual artists a $1,000 prize and portfolio publication, as chosen by noted artists and curators.

== Selected artwork ==
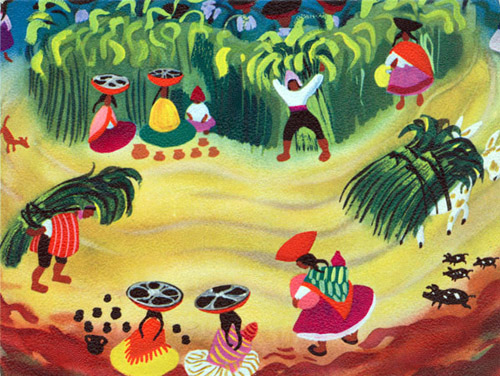
Blair, Mary (1941), Street Market Card, South America

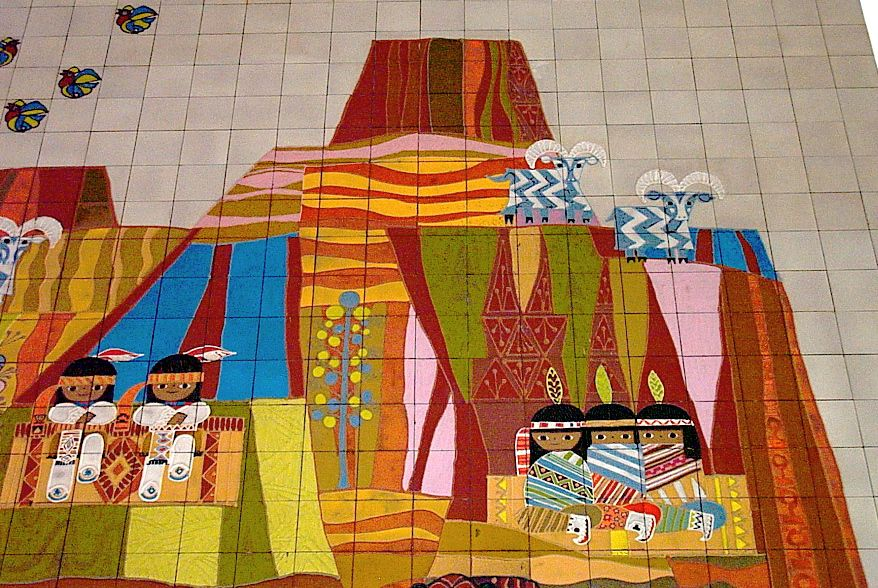
Blair, Mary (1971), "Mosaic", Contemporary Resort, Disney.

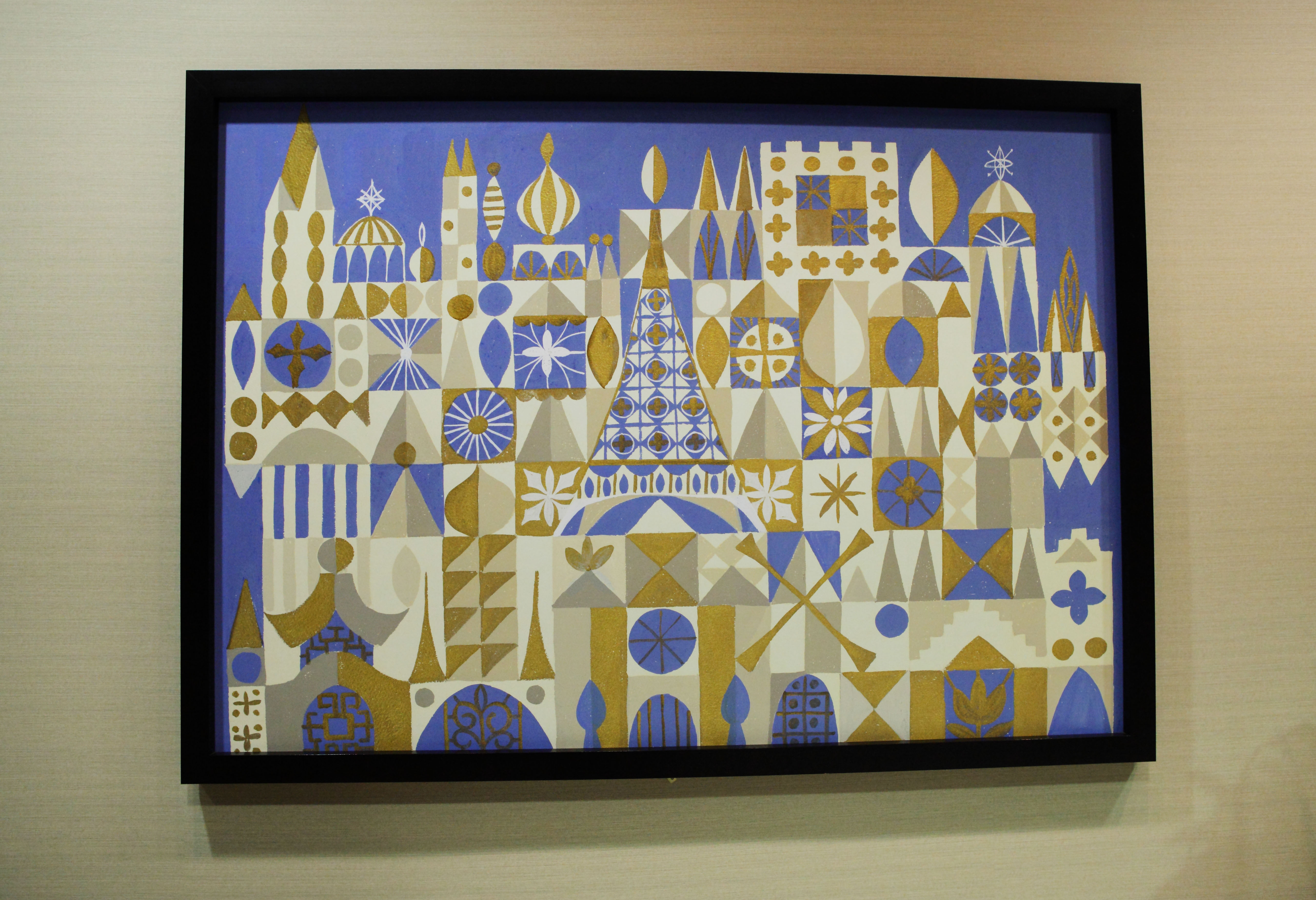
Concept art for It's a Small World by Mary Blair, on display at the Disneyland Hotel

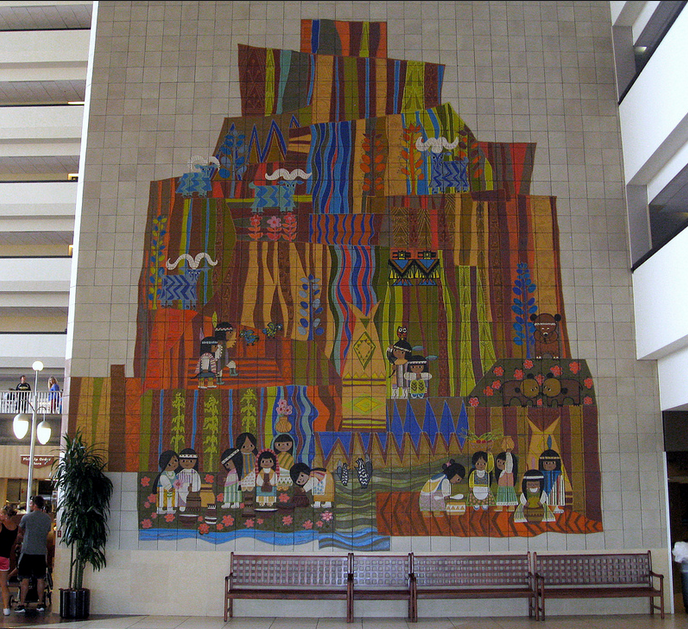
Blair's Mural at the Contemporary Resort

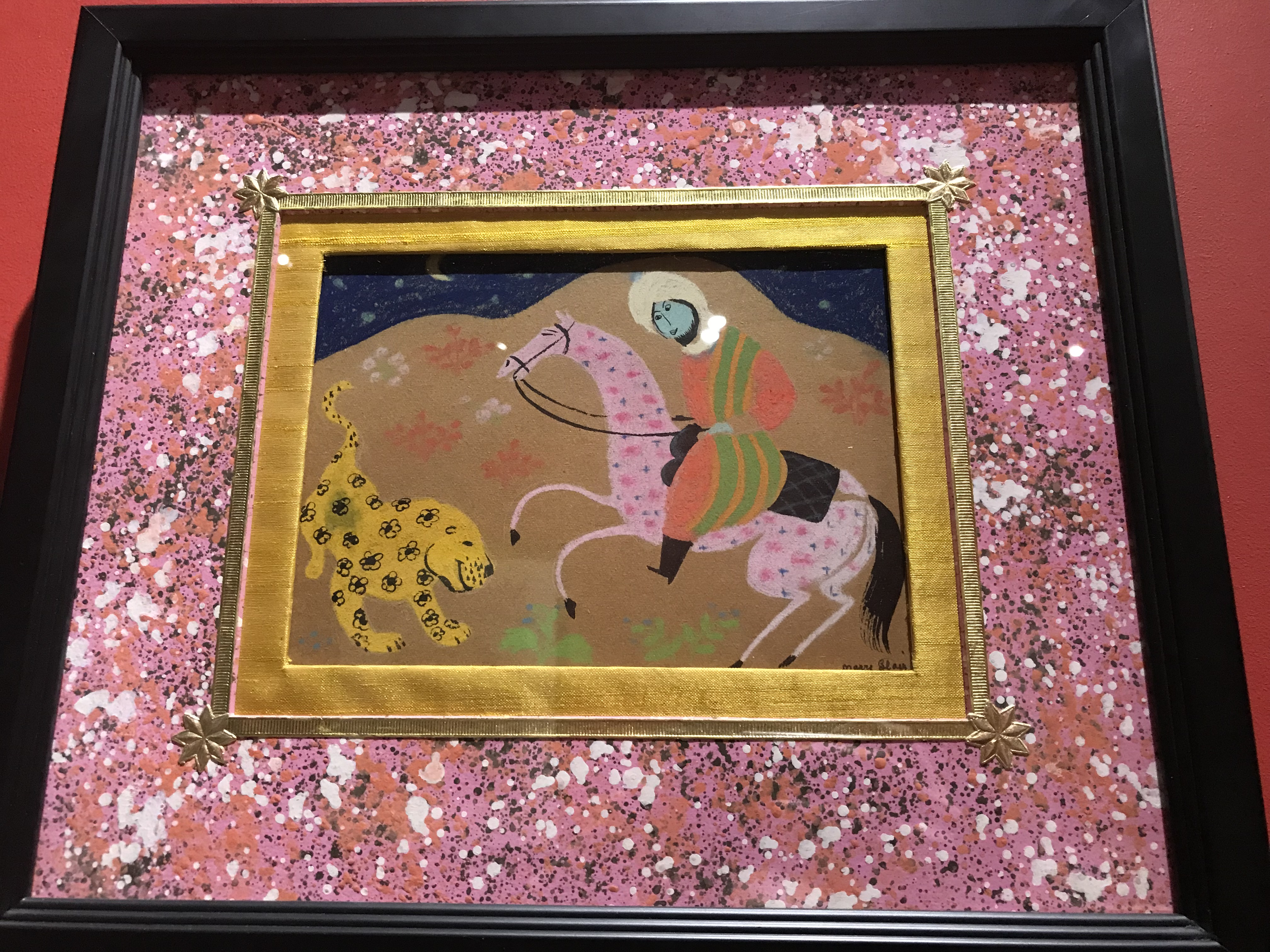
Arabian Nights concept art, 1942, by Mary Blair

== Bibliography ==
- Blair, Mary; McHugh, Gelolo (2010) [1950], Baby's House, Little Golden Books, Simon & Schuster, ISBN 978-0-375-85460-6.
- Blair, Mary; Krauss, Ruth (1992) [1951], I Can Fly, Little Golden Books, Simon & Schuster, ISBN 0-307-00146-6.
- Blair, Mary; Lloyd, Norman (1955), The New Golden Song Book, Golden Press.
