= Star 106.3 =

Townsville, Queensland; Australia
- Broadcast area: Townsville
- Frequency: 106.3 MHz FM
- Branding: Star 106.3

Programming
- Language: English
- Format: Hot Adult Contemporary

Ownership
- Owner: ARN; (Radio Townsville Pty Ltd)
- Sister stations: Power100

History
- First air date: 8 June 1999; 26 years ago

Technical information
- Class: Commercial
- Transmitter coordinates: 16°4′2″N 3°1′1″E

Links
- Website: star1063fm.com.au

Star 106.3 (ACMA callsign: 4RGT) is a commercial Australian FM radio station based in Townsville, Queensland owned by ARN.

== History ==
Star 106.3 was established as Mix FM in 1999 by RG Capital, headed by Reg Grundy. In 2003, the station was sold alongside sister station Sea FM (now Zinc 100.7) to Macquarie Regional RadioWorks. However, Macquarie was forced to sell two stations to ensure diversity in the market, and in 2005 Mix FM and Sea FM were sold to Prime Media Group. In 2007, Mix FM was rebranded as 106.3, later rebranded as 106.3FM in 2009.

In 2013, Prime Media Group sold its radio division to Grant Broadcasters. In May 2016, the station rebranded as Star 106.3, bringing it in line with sister stations in Mackay and Cairns.

In November 2021, Star 106.3, along with other stations owned by Grant Broadcasters, were acquired by the Australian Radio Network. This deal will allow Grant's stations, including Star 106.3, to access ARN's iHeartRadio platform in regional areas. The deal was finalized on 4 January 2022. It is expected Star 106.3 will integrate with ARN's KIIS Network, but will retain its current name according to the press release from ARN.

== See also ==
- Media in Townsville
