= Portal (1986 video game) =

1986 video game

- Developer: Nexa Corporation
- Publisher: Activision
- Designer: Brad Fregger
- Writer: Rob Swigart
- Platforms: Amiga, Commodore 64, Apple II, IBM PC, Mac
- Release: 1986
- Genre: Interactive fiction
- Mode: Single-player

Portal is a text-driven adventure with a graphical interface published for the Amiga in 1986 by Activision. The writing is by American author Rob Swigart, and it was produced by Brad Fregger. Ports to the Commodore 64, Apple II, and IBM PC were later released. A version for the Atari ST was announced and developed, but not published. Until recently, it was thought that a Mac version left unpublished. The published Mac version was rediscovered in 2021 by a game collector.

== Plot ==
The computer terminal interface

The player, taking on the role of the unnamed astronaut protagonist, returns from a failed 100-year voyage to 61 Cygni to find the Earth devoid of humans. Cars are rusted and covered with moss, the streets are completely barren, and everything appears as though the entire human race had just vanished suddenly. The player happens upon a barely functioning computer terminal that is tied into a storytelling mainframe, Homer. Through this interface, the player, assisted by Homer who attempts to weave the information into a coherent narrative, discovers information in order to piece together the occurrences leading to the disappearance of the human race. For instance, spending some time in the Medical Records section may unlock a piece of data in the Science section, and through these links the player can finish the game.

== Reception ==
Info gave the Commodore 64 version of Portal five stars out of five, describing it as "engrossing, fascinating, and somewhat disturbing ... like a murder mystery, an expedition, and having amnesia all rolled into one". Roy Wagner of Computer Gaming World described the story as "interesting and well-written", but felt the interface was tedious. The Amiga version, using a mouse, was considered superior to that of the C64, and only bothered the reviewer by way of slowing down the reading of the story. The magazine's Charles Ardai agreed that the interface was tedious and hesitated to recommend it because it was not a game, but said that the quality of the writing was very high.

== Novel ==
A hardcover novel, titled Portal: A Dataspace Retrieval (1988) and composed mostly of the text from the interactive novel with some new additions, was written by the same author, Rob Swigart, and first published by St. Martin's Press. It takes the form of a series of notes on different subjects, in an order the player would encounter them through Homer. A softcover edition was released by Backinprint.com in 2001.

An eBook was released "under the Creative Commons BY-NC-ND Unported license 3.0". The author has allowed it to be uploaded to the MobileRead forum.

== Legacy ==
In April 2012, author Rob Swigart and Subliminal Games launched a Kickstarter fundraising campaign called "Rob Swigart's Portal (1986) Reborn" to recreate the world of Portal as a modern third-person adventure game. Some of the features set to be included were moving backward or forward in time through a simulation of the past and changing the character's appearance for different responses and reactions by virtual non-player characters. On June 5, the project creator cancelled the Kickstarter project, having raised only $22,796 of the $530,000 target.

== Resurrection ==
Washington State University Vancouver re-created this work as a VR game in its Fall 2023 Senior Seminar.

== See also ==
- Murder on the Mississippi
