= Townsville Bulletin =

Newspaper in Queensland, Australia

Coordinates: 19.2627°S 146.8155°E

- Front page of the Townsville Bulletin; 6 October 2007
- Type: Monday - Saturday newspaper
- Format: Tabloid
- Owner: News Corp Australia
- Publisher: Queensland Newspapers
- Editor: Cas Garvey
- Founded: 1881
- Language: English
- Headquarters: Townsville, Australia; Shop 2, 62 Walker St; Townsville QLD 4810
- Circulation: 84,000 Monday-Friday; 104,000 Saturday
- Price: A$1.10 Monday-Friday; A$1.70 Saturday
- Website: townsvillebulletin.com.au

The Townsville Bulletin is a daily newspaper published in Townsville, Queensland, Australia, formerly known as the Townsville Daily Bulletin. It is the only daily paper that serves the northern Queensland region. The paper has a print edition, a subscription digital edition and a website.

The newspaper is published by The North Queensland Newspaper Company Pty Ltd, which has been a subsidiary of News Limited since 1984. News Limited is Australia's largest newspaper publisher and a subsidiary of News Corporation associated with Rupert Murdoch.

The Bulletin is published Monday through Saturday, with a higher price on the Saturday edition. It is in tabloid format.

== History ==
The town of Townsville's early newspaper was The Cleveland Bay Herald and Northern Pioneer which came into existence on 3 March 1866, which was soon renamed as the Cleveland Bay Express, and later became the Townsville Herald. The Townsville Bulletin was then established on 5 September 1881 by Edward Rhode, John Kiley Mehan (–1941) and Dodd Smith Clarke (–July 1918). Rhode, Mehan, and Clarke had previously started a newspaper in Cairns.

Co-founder and first editor Clarke was credited as 'mainly instrumental through his brilliant writings in making the venture the success it proved'. It was priced at three pence, a 50% reduction on that of the two other local newspapers, and became a daily publication on 1 January 1883. Out of this, the North Queensland Bulletin was launched as a weekly journal by mid-1883.

With the formation of the Townsville Newspaper Company in 1884, the Townsville Herald was acquired, and later merged into the Bulletin. It would appear as the North Queensland Herald.

The Bulletin offices were first in a premises on the eastern side of Stokes Street, before moving to a larger premises at south-eastern corner of Flinders and Stanley Streets from 1887 to 1896. The company then moved to the south-western corner of the intersection, until November 1908 when they moved further west on Flinders Street to a two-story building. Prior to air conditioning systems, the building was selected for cool air flow, and had installed an electric fan system.

The original newspaper was printed on a double demy Albion hand press, followed about 1883 by a gas engine powering a small single feeder Inglis machine – which printed two pages at a time, resulting in 250 newspapers an hour – before settling on a Cox Duplex rotary self-feeding and folding machine, able to turn out 1000 eight-page broadsheet by 1909. Electricity had also been installed, but with gas lighting maintained in case of emergency.

Staffing-wise, the 1881 start saw three proprietors and a boy; by 1909, eight staff had over twenty years service with the company.

A fire of the premises on 18 October 1912 destroyed much of the newspaper's early records. Described as completely gutted other than for the strong-room, insurance amounts totalled £13,680. The newspaper continued for the moment between the Evening Star and Northern Miner offices.

The Bulletin was later amalgamated with The Northern Miner, and in 1940, it incorporated The Townsville Evening Star.

== Modern era ==
In 1984, the Townsville Daily Bulletin was acquired by News Corp Australia and renamed as the Townsville Bulletin.

The newspaper chartered a Boeing 747 to take North Queensland fans to the 2005 NRL grand final, the Cowboys' first.

It was awarded News Limited's Regional Newspaper of the Year in 2009.

Along with nearly every other News Corp newspaper, the Bulletin endorsed the Liberal Party in its editorial on the 2019 Australian federal election.

== Personnel ==
- John Gagliardi, editor, 1970s
- Geoff Hill, journalist, 1980s.
- Christopher Mitchell, journalist, 1970s.
- Alexander Vindex Vennard, writer under the pen names of Bill Bowyang, Frank Reid, and Maurice Deane, 1920s to 1940s. Vennard also wrote for The North Queensland Register.

== Digitisation ==
The paper has been digitised as part of the Australian Newspapers Digitisation Program of the National Library of Australia.

== See also ==
- Media in Townsville
