= John Steinbeck Award for Fiction =

The John Steinbeck Award for Fiction is an annual short-story competition by Reed Magazine of San José State University. The award was founded in 2002 by Chris Fink, who was at the time the faculty advisor for Reed. The submissions window is open June 1 through November 1, and the judge varies from year to year. Among the notable judges of the award are Tobias Wolff, ZZ Packer, and Vanessa Hua. The winning entrant receives $1,000 and publication of the submitted story in the magazine.
