= Murder on the Mississippi =

1986 video game

- Developers: Activision; Tose (Famicom)
- Publishers: Activision; Jaleco (Famicom)
- Producer: Brad Fregger
- Designer: Adam Bellin
- Artist: Hilary Mills
- Writer: Rob Swigart
- Composer: Ed Bogas
- Platforms: Apple II, Commodore 64, Commodore 128, MSX2, Famicom
- Release: October 31, 1986 (Famicom); 1987 (MSX2)
- Genre: Adventure
- Mode: Single-player

Murder on the Mississippi: The Adventures of Sir Charles Foxworth is a 1986 adventure game developed and published by Activision for Commodore 64, Commodore 128, and Apple II personal computers, and licensed by Jaleco exclusively in Japan for the Famicom and MSX2 as Mississippi Satsujin Jiken (ミシシッピー殺人事件, lit. "Mississippi Murder Case"). It is an adventure game in which the player must solve a murder mystery on the luxury ship "Delta Princess". The story is based loosely on the Agatha Christie novel Death on the Nile.

The Famicom game is known as a kusoge (i.e. a terrible game). in Japan.

== Plot ==
While heading to New Orleans from St. Louis on the ship "Delta Princess", detective Sir Charles and Watson are caught up in the midst of a murder case by chance, that they must solve.

== Characters (passengers and crew) ==
- Sir Charles (チャールズ卿)

Not Holmes. Becomes the second victim. His appearance is similar to that of a painting of Sherlock Holmes by Charles Doyle (Arthur Conan Doyle's father).

- Watson (ワトソン)

Known as "Regis" in the Activision version. Only a few of his memos can be taken. He occasionally takes walks by himself without any notice. After Charles' death, he longs to do everything over again the right way.

- Dizzy (ディジー)

A prostitute, staying in Room 8. Going to New Orleans to visit her Aunt Pearl. Her aunt's secret formula for Okra soup is popular among the passengers.

- Taylor (テーラー)

Prostitute from Nevada. Staying in Room 2F20.

- Carter (カーター)

Judge staying in Room 9. Has a reputation for drinking.

- Helen (ヘレン)

The widow of a millionaire, staying in Room 2F23. Has a very bad reputation amongst the passengers.

- Nelson (ネルソン)

The captain. Speaks of the incident even before entering the cabin and discovering the body.

- William (ウィリアム)

Philanthropist staying in Room 2F15. His hobby is shooting, and he often hits birds.

- Henry (ヘンリー)

Crew member staying in Room 1F27. Brown's illegitimate son. Is in love with Taylor.

- Brown (ブラウン)

The victim, found dead in Room 4. Owner of the Delta Princess, which he co-manages with Nelson. Also managed many additional businesses.

== Gameplay ==
=== Trap ===
Pitfalls exist in Room 1 and Room 14. Falling through one of these holes results in death and an instant game over. There is also a trap in Room 16, in which a knife flies through the air towards Sir Charles immediately after he enters. Unless the knife is dodged it hits Sir Charles in the head and kills him, resulting in another instant game over. While solving the case reveals the true criminal, the identity of the person that set these traps remains a mystery.

=== Re-interviewing characters ===
Each suspect can only be spoken to once per piece of new information – consequently, if there is a piece of information missed the first time around, since it is impossible to talk to them again this can lead to the player becoming impossibly stuck in the game and unable to progress any further.

== Reception ==
Compute! called Murder on the Mississippi "a rich, enjoyable adventure game".

In Japan, the Famicom version of the game is widely known as a "historic", (Note: 歴史的な, rekishiteki na) or even "legendary" (Note: 伝説の, densetsu no) kusoge (i.e. terrible game). Reasons cited include that the lack of a save feature, necessitating that the game be replayed from the beginning every session; the instant-death traps being unreasonable; the specific order of steps being required to complete the game being unreasonably particular; re-interviewing characters being impossible despite the information they offer changing based on ostensibly illogical requirements; and adult themes and language being used despite the Famicom's young audience.

== See also ==
- Portal
