= Graceville Correctional Facility =

Private state prison in Graceville, Florida

Coordinates: 30°56′39″N 85°29′22″W

- Interactive map of Graceville Correctional Facility
- Location: 5168 Ezell Road Graceville, Florida
- Status: mixed
- Capacity: 1884
- Opened: 2007
- Managed by: MTC

The Graceville Correctional Facility is a private state prison for men located in Graceville, Jackson County, Florida, which has been operated since 2007 by CCA, GEO, and MTC under contract with the Florida Department of Corrections.

This facility was opened in 2007 and has a maximum capacity of 1884 prisoners housed at various security levels.

In 2015, Daniel Craven, who was serving life without parole for murder at Graceville, stabbed and killed his cellmate John Anderson, and he was since sentenced to death for the murder.
