= Daniel Craven (murderer) =

American convicted murderer (born 1986)

- Born: January 20, 1986 (age 40); Florida, U.S.
- Status: Incarcerated on death row
- Conviction: First degree murder (×2)
- Penalty: 2014: Life without parole; 2018: Death

Details
- Victims: 2
- Date: April 2011 – June 2015
- Country: United States
- State: Florida
- Locations: Orange County, Florida (April 2011); Graceville Correctional Facility, Florida (June 2015)
- Date apprehended: August 2013
- Imprisoned at: Union Correctional Institution

Daniel Jacob Craven Jr. (born January 20, 1986) is an American convicted murderer who killed two people in Florida between 2011 and 2015. In April 2011, Craven murdered his romantic rival, Ronald Justice, by beating him to death with a baseball bat before he burned the body. Craven was arrested two years after the crime, and he was charged, convicted, and sentenced to life without parole in August 2014.

However, in June 2015, while serving his life sentence at the Graceville Correctional Facility, Craven stabbed and murdered his cellmate John Anderson, a crime for which he was ultimately sentenced to death after being found guilty in June 2018. Craven is currently awaiting execution on Florida’s death row.

== Murder of Ronald Justice ==
On April 6, 2011, Daniel Jacob Craven Jr., then 25 years old, committed his first murder, killing 30-year-old Ronald Justice, a father of two children who was Craven's romantic rival. Prior to the murder, Craven previously had an affair with Justice's wife, and this led to the breakup of Justice's marriage. On the date of the murder, Craven went to find Justice at a home he was squatting on, and attacked the latter with a baseball bat. Despite Justice's pleas for mercy, Craven beaten him with the bat multiple times.

After the beatings, Craven handcuffed Justice outside the house, and he killed Justice by drowning him in a dog bowl. Subsequently, Craven wrapped Justice's body up and took him to an Apopka home, where he burned the body for several days in a pit he dug and used to burn trash and furniture. After burning Justice's body, Craven threw the bigger bits of bone in the trash, and used a concrete brick to crush Justice's charred skull.

Justice was not reported missing for more than a year until May 2012, when his ex-fiancée heard rumours that he was likely killed, coupled with the fact that Justice stopped showing up to visit his children or keep up with the child-support payment checks. This prompted the ex-fiancée to report Justice missing. In April 2013, as part of their investigations into the disappearance of Justice, the police went to two potential crime scenes in Orange County to conduct site searches, mainly because these places were where Justice was known to frequently go to. Firstly, the investigators dug a backyard along Adirondak Court before they headed to a house in Slote Drive.

Subsequently, during a search at the Slote Drive house, the police dug up the burnt remains of Justice, which brought his death into revelation, and the authorities also managed to link Craven as the killer of the case after they probed relatives, friends, and associates of Craven. Ultimately, on August 22, 2013, Craven was arrested in Greensboro, North Carolina, and was set to be returned to Florida to face charges for murdering Justice.

== First murder trial ==
After he was returned to Orange County in Florida, Daniel Craven was charged with the first-degree murder of Ronald Justice.

Craven was formally indicted by an Orange County grand jury in October 2013, and according to reports, Craven reportedly admitted to his sister that he had not only killed Justice, but he also murdered another four people. The authorities investigated Craven's claims to verify the existence of the other victims, and there were fears that he was possibly a serial killer. Further investigations also revealed that Craven had reportedly bragged about killing Justice in front of many people, who did not dare to report his claims to the police out of fear for their safety.

On August 18, 2014, a year after his arrest, Craven stood trial before a 12-member Orange County jury for the first-degree murder of Justice. The trial lasted for three days before the jury ultimately found Craven guilty of first-degree murder. After the guilty verdict, Craven was sentenced to life imprisonment without the possibility of parole by Circuit Judge Marc Lubet.

Less than a month after the sentencing of Craven, in September 2014, the Orange County Sheriff's Office publicly appealed for any crucial information or witnesses that could assist them in their investigations against Craven, with hopes of verifying if he had killed more victims in the past before his arrest for Justice's killing. As of 2026, there were no new developments in the investigation.

== Murder of John Anderson ==
After he was sentenced to life for Ronald Justice's murder, Daniel Craven was taken to the Graceville Correctional Facility to serve his sentence in early April 2015, and two months later, while behind bars, Craven committed his second murder by killing his cellmate, 53-year-old John H. Anderson, on June 28, 2015.

When he first arrived in Graceville, Craven, who openly identified as a white supremacist and even tattooed a swastika on himself, was assigned to share a cell with Anderson, an African American inmate. He reportedly considered requesting a cell transfer but ultimately decided against it. According to reports, Craven intended to kill Anderson and use the murder to incite a racial war among inmates of different races. His alleged motive was partly influenced by the 2015 Charleston church shooting, in which white supremacist Dylann Roof murdered nine African American worshippers. Roof was eventually sentenced to death by the United States federal government for the massacre in 2017.

On the date of the murder, at about 2am, Craven used a homemade knife to stab Anderson 13 times in his sleep, and therefore killed him. After murdering Anderson, Craven cleaned up his cell, and placed the murder weapon inside a sock before he hid it under a shower drain. At around 12:25pm, about ten hours after Anderson's murder, Craven admitted to a corrections officer that he stabbed his cellmate to death and further directed the officers to where he hid the shank. The officers headed to Craven's prison cell, where they found Anderson's body and pronounced him dead.

At the time of his death, Anderson was serving a life sentence since 1998 for two counts of armed robbery with a gun, aggravated battery with a deadly weapon and carjacking with a deadly weapon, and his crimes took place in Alachua County, Florida. The Florida Department of Law Enforcement took over the investigations into Anderson's death, which they initially reported to be the result of an "inmate on inmate altercation".

A medical exmainer's autopsy findings revealed that Anderson sustained about 30 injuries on his head, throat, neck, and upper torso, including 12 stab wounds that penetrated the skin, while the remainder were incised wounds that cut the skin. The stab wounds to Anderson’s windpipe and jugular vein were particularly critical. Anderson died from a combination of substantial blood loss and the inhalation of blood caused by the stab wounds. There were defensive injuries on Anderson's palms and wrists. According to the medical examiner, Anderson did not die an immediate death and it possibly took from minutes to half an hour, during which Anderson essentially choked and drowned in his own blood after the stabbing.

== Second murder trial ==
On July 18, 2016, a year after he killed John Anderson, Daniel Craven was formally indicted by a Jackson County grand jury for one count of first-degree murder over Anderson's death.

On August 23, 2016, State Attorney Glenn Hess formally announced his intention to seek the death penalty against Craven, citing four aggravating circumstances: Craven was previously convicted of murder; Craven was incarcerated for a prior felony at the time of the present offence; Anderson's murder was especially heinous, atrocious or cruel; and it was committed in a cold, calculated and premeditated manner.

Craven was transferred to Florida State Prison in 2016 as a result of his indictment and murder charge. By December 2017, Craven was relocated to the Santa Rosa Correctional Institution, and while imprisoned at the facility, Craven attacked and attempted to strangle two correctional officers while they were entering his cell to restrain him. As a result of this incident, Craven was moved to the Northwest Florida Reception Center, and he was charged in May 2018 with two counts of attempted first-degree murder.

On June 27, 2018, Craven stood trial before a Jackson County jury for the murder of John Anderson. During the proceedings, which lasted for two days, the prosecution summoned the correctional officers and inmates known to the victim as witnesses. They argued that Craven had intentionally killed Anderson and this was not a case of either self-defense or voluntary intoxication that led to the killing, and further contended this was a clear-cut case of first-degree murder that warranted the guilty verdict. The defence did not dispute Craven's guilt in the case but they sought to downgrade the charge to a non-capital homicide offence that would not result in the death penalty. Craven did not take the stand to enter his defence, but the jury heard his recorded statements, one of which included his proclamation to use Anderson's death to inspire and start a racial war between the white and African-American inmates.

On June 28, 2018, the jury found Craven guilty of first-degree murder. A sentencing hearing was held the next day on June 29, 2018, and the defence called upon Craven's half-brother (who was also jailed in a state prison) to testify about the defendant's abusive childhood, and a psychiatric expert also testified on behalf of the defense, stating that Craven suffered from psychiatric issues, especially post traumatic stress disorder as a result of trauma and abuse. However, the prosecution called upon another psychiatric expert who rebutted the defence's arguments, stating there was no abnormality of the mind on Craven's part. Later that same day, after two hours of deliberation, the jury unanimously voted to sentence Craven to death for murdering Anderson.

On September 12, 2018, Craven was officially sentenced to death by 14th Circuit Judge Christopher Patterson, who accepted the jury's recommendation for capital punishment. During sentencing, Judge Patterson considered several aggravating factors, including Craven's history of violence, the heinous nature of Anderson's death, and the premeditated nature of the homicide, before he decided on the death sentence.

According to the prosecution, Craven was the first defendant in the 14th judicial circuit to be sentenced to death after the state of Florida amended its laws to allow the death sentence be imposed solely based on unanimous jury votes. The law was only in effect until 2023, when the state of Florida passed a new law to allow non-unanimous jury votes from eight or more jurors to impose death sentences, partly due to the infamous school shooter Nikolas Cruz escaping the death sentence for 17 murders after the jury failed to unanimously decide on a death sentence.

== Death row ==
In December 2019, a year after he was condemned to death row, Daniel Craven filed an appeal to the Florida Supreme Court against his sentence and conviction. On October 22, 2020, the Florida Supreme Court dismissed Craven's appeal against his death sentence.

On October 4, 2021, the Supreme Court of the United States denied Craven's petition for a writ of certiorari in his appeal of his death sentence.

As of 2026, Craven is incarcerated on death row at the Union Correctional Institution.

== See also ==
- Capital punishment in Florida
- List of death row inmates in the United States § Florida
