= Reed Magazine =

American literary journal

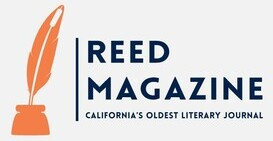
- Type: Annual
- Format: Literary Journal
- Owner: San Jose State University
- Founded: 1867 (claimed); 1948 (actual)
- Language: English
- Headquarters: San Jose, California
- ISSN: 1524-8194
- OCLC number: 41231982
- Website: http://reedmag.org/

Reed Magazine is an annual literary journal published by San Jose State University. Two semesters of the Department of English and Comparative Literature's 133 class (comprising graduate and undergraduate students) solicit, edit, and promote the magazine for each year. It is the oldest literary journal based in California.

The journal prints art, poetry, and prose (fiction and nonfiction). It also sponsors the Edwin Markham Prize for Poetry, the John Steinbeck Award for Fiction, the Gabriele Rico Challenge for Nonfiction, the Mary Blair Award for Art, and the Emerging Voices Contest for Santa Clara County, California high-school students.

== History ==
The earliest student-published literary collection by students of the California State Normal School (now San Jose State University), was a pamphlet in 1867 named The Acorn. Several literary journals followed it, including The Class Paper from 1880–82, The Normal Index from 1885-91, and The Normal Pennant from 1898-1909. The school's English department published The Quill from 1925 to 1931 and El Portal from 1932 to 1941. After World War II, in 1948, The Reed Literary Magazine was first published by Pegasus, a literary society at San Jose State, with assistance from the school's Associated Student Body. Its name was later shortened to just Reed Magazine. Reed Magazine claims 1867 as the beginning of its heritage through these prior publications.

Some dispute exists about the origin of the journal's name, the magazine currently claims that it honors James F. Reed, a survivor of the Donner Party and prominent local citizen who donated the land that would become the San Jose State campus. While others, including the magazine itself at various points, say that name of Reed was derived from a quote by French enlightenment thinker Blaise Pascal:

Man is but a reed, the most feeble thing in nature; but he is a thinking reed.... All our dignity consists in thought. By it we elevate ourselves, and not by space and time, which we can never fill. Let us make it our task, then, to think well: here is the principle of morality.

Reed Magazine has published pieces by Pulitzer Prize winner William Finnegan, U.S. Poet Laureate Robert Hass, PEN/Faulkner winner T. C. Boyle, and National Book Award winner Ursula K. Le Guin.

== Notable contributors ==
- Jacob M. Appel
- T. C. Boyle
- Stephen Dixon
- Cory Doctorow
- William Finnegan
- Forrest Gander
- Cristina Garcia
- Robert Hass
- Brenda Hillman
- Andrew Lam
- Ursula K. Le Guin
- Cathleen Miller
- Nayomi Munaweera
- Naomi Shihab Nye
- Emmy Pérez
- Mark Slouka
- Michael Ernest Sweet
- Arthur Sze
- Rodrigo Toscano
- Vendela Vida
- Al Young
- Arisa White
- Kenny Fries
- Mary Elizabeth Parker
- Kyle Killen
- Stephen Roger Powers
- Ed Sams
- Mark Wisniewski
- Walter Griffin
- Soma Mei Sheng Frazier

== Trivia ==
- The transition of numbering copies of Reed Magazine from Issue 70 instead to Issue 150 in 2017 was because the literary journal was celebrating its 150th anniversary.
  - The last copy to use the term "volume" was Reed Magazine 66.
  - After that, the magazine was labeled as "A literary Mosaic since 1867" for a few years.

== See also ==
- List of literary magazines
