= California State Poetry Society =

U.S. non-profit poetry association

- Established: 1971
- Type: Poetry organization
- Website: www.californiastatepoetrysociety.org

The California State Poetry Society (CSPS) is a non-profit state-level poetry association in the U.S. state of California, affiliated with the National Federation of State Poetry Societies. The organization promotes poetry, conducts monthly and annual contests, organizes periodic conferences, and awards an annual Pushcart Prize for outstanding work published in the California Quarterly journal.

== History ==
The California State Poetry Society was established in 1971 by a group of poets who met on the beach near the San Luis Obispo campus of the California Polytechnic State University. Nelle Fertig and Vivian Way Bonine were members of NFSPS and recommended establishing a chapter affiliated with the national poetry organization. The constitution was approved on November 20, 1976, and the organization was incorporated as a 501(c)(3) California nonprofit corporation on August 14, 1985.

California Quarterly, Vol 35, No 1, January 1, 2009

The Society's mission is to promote poetry and art in California and around the world, and donor generosity ensures the quality of its publications. CSPS is the official state organization representing California to the National Federation of State Poetry Societies (NFSPS).

== Activities ==
CSPS has published the California Quarterly journal since the fall of 1972, a quality poetry journal that accepts submissions from California poets and some from outside the state. Issues are normally 64 pages, perfect bound and with a glossy cover, and the archives of the journal are kept in the California State Library in Sacramento. The CSPS also publishes a Poetry Letter, the Strophes and Newsbriefs.

The organization conducts events, an annual contest and monthly contests, as well as organizing periodic conferences, and awards the annual Pushcart Prize for outstanding work published in the journal.
