= Kerschner =

Kerschner is a German-language occupational surname literally meaning "furrier". Notable people with the surname include:

- Francis Kerschner Myers
- Paul A. Kerschner
