= Paul Robeson Theatre =

Paul Robeson Theatre may refer to:

- A theatre in the South Shore Cultural Center, Chicago, Illinois
- A theatre in the former Store Front Museum, Queens, New York
- A theatre in Buffalo), New York; see Margaret Ford-Taylor
- A theatre in Hounslow, West London; see African and Caribbean War Memorial
- Paul Robeson Theatre (Brooklyn), once at the St. Casimir's Roman Catholic Church (Brooklyn)
