= Cooper School of Art =

Defunct art college based in Cleveland

Coordinates: 41°30′05″N 81°40′30″W

Cooper School of Art, Inc.
- Type: Private art school
- Active: 1924–1981
- Founder: Hal Cooper
- President: Donald H. Wright
- Location: 2112 Euclid Avenue (1968–1978), Cleveland, Ohio, United States
- Campus: Urban

The Cooper School of Art was a private art college located in Cleveland, Ohio. The school emphasized education and career preparation for the commercial art market. It operated from 1924 until 1981.

== Overview ==
The Cooper School of Art featured a two-year, eight-quarter diploma program, with certificates in design, drawing, airbrush, painting, layout, lettering, illustration, greeting card design, animation, architectural illustration, cartooning, production art, photography, and printmaking. Faculty tended to be working professionals in their field.

Comics artist Tom Mandrake, who attended the school for two years in the 1970s, said Cooper was "primarily a commercial art school and it gave me a good grounding in the basics. They also stressed the importance of balancing work and deadlines."

== History ==
The school was founded in 1924 as Hal Cooper's School of Advertisement. It later became known as the Hal H. Cooper School of Art. (Hal Cooper moved on to became president of the American Society of Cartoonists in 1948, founded the Aurora School of Art in 1951, and was headmaster of another Hal H. Cooper School of Art in Aurora, Illinois, in 1955.)

The director of the Cleveland Cooper School of Art in 1955 was William Whittset.

=== Closure ===
The fall semester of 1980 was a tumultuous period for the Cooper School of Art. The school's president and lone shareholder Donald H. Wright, an insurance salesman, became entangled in a rental dispute with the school's landlord, leading to a court-appointed receiver collecting overdue rent. Cooper students protested at the Cleveland Justice Center and the landlord's attorney's offices.

In the aftermath, Wright and the school faced a barrage of lawsuits from teachers seeking unpaid wages, creditors, and disgruntled students. Faculty members unsuccessfully attempted to purchase the school, resulting in 12 teachers resigning in protest of the administration. The school's dean of education was fired.

At one point, students sought a restraining order against Wright, who faced criticism and televised scrutiny for his actions. Despite these challenges, Wright continued his search for a new facility, and in December 1980, the school relocated to a new facility in Ohio City, housed in a former department store. The challenges persisted, however, with encounters with city inspectors, fire code violations, and ongoing unrest among faculty and students.

By the spring of the next year, Cooper faced a shutdown, with bankruptcy proceeding against the school initiated by three creditors (those charges were later dismissed). The school closed for good in 1981.

== Locations ==
For many years, the school was located at 6300 Euclid Avenue, near the intersection of East 65th Street, on the second floor of an industrial building, sharing occupancy with the Cleveland Engineering Institute.

From 1968 to 1978, the school was located in the Wolfe Music Building, at 2112 Euclid Avenue (between East 21st and East 22nd Sts).

From 1978 to 1980, the school moved to a location with two street addresses — 2341 Carnegie Avenue and 2402 Prospect Avenue East — near East 22nd Street and adjacent to the city's Innerbelt Freeway.

The school's final location, starting in late 1980, was a building in Ohio City.

== Faculty and administration ==
The last owner and president of the school was insurance salesman Donald H. Wright. Former deans at the school included Nick Livaitch, Joseph Hruby, Charles "Chuck" Bowen, and Samuel Evey.

Notable artist/illustrator Elmer Brown taught at the school in the 1960s until his 1971 death. Realist painter Marilyn Szalay also taught at the school. In 1978, musician/artist Mark Jones held a brief professorship at Cooper, where he lectured on philosophy and art history, and taught drawing.

Other faculty included Chuck Bowen, Jose Cintron, Bruce Cline, Paul Denis, John W. Dorsey, Lucy Eidimtas, Sam Evey, Vincent Ferrara, Ken Fritz, Ed Glynn, Joseph Hruby, Terry Johnson, Mary Koster, Paul Missal, Andrew Russetti, Anthony Schepis, Susan Bodenger Skove, Marv Smith, Reed Thomason, and Lois Vance.

Beloved staff at the school were artists Joel Bartell and David Schwartz.

== Notable former students and alumni ==
- Hank Berger (1970s), nightclub owner and merchandiser
- Muriel Fahrion (illustration, late 1960s), illustrator and the original designer of the Strawberry Shortcake franchise
- Ray Harm (late 1940s), wildlife painter
- Tom Mandrake (1970s), comics artist
- Mary Beth McKenzie (late 1960s), realist painter
- Scott Miller (1974–1978), postmodern painter
- Gloria Plevin (mid-1960s), realist painter and printmaker
- Gerry Shamray (1977–1980), comics artist
- William E. Smith (early 1950s), African American artist recognized for exploring Black experiences in his art
- Jerome Tiger (mid-1960s), Muscogee Nation-Seminole painter
- Oscar Velasquez, muralist

== See also ==
- Cleveland Institute of Art
