= Mark Jones =

Mark Jones may refer to:

== Arts and entertainment ==
- Mark Bence-Jones (1930–2010), British writer
- Mark Jones (actor) (1939–2010), British actor
- Mark Jones (museum director) (born 1951), British art historian and museum director
- Mark Jones (musician) (born 1952), American visual artist, musician and poet
- Mark Jones (filmmaker) (1953–2026), American screenwriter, director and producer
- Mark Lewis Jones (born 1964), Welsh actor
- Mark Jones (born 1967), real name of English comedian Mark Lamarr
- Mark Jones (Wall of Sound) (fl. 1990s), English musician, founder of Wall of Sound Records
- Mark Jones, English musician, co-founder of Jeepster Records in 1995
- Mark W. Jones, author of A Walk around the Snickelways of York (1983)

== Sports ==
=== Association football (soccer) ===
- Mark Jones (footballer, born 1933) (1933–1958), English defender who played for Manchester United until his death in the Munich air disaster
- Mark Jones (footballer, born September 1961), English midfielder who played for Oxford United, Swindon Town and Cardiff City
- Mark Jones (footballer, born October 1961), English full back who played for Aston Villa, Brighton & Hove Albion, Birmingham City and Hereford United
- Mark Jones (footballer, born 1966), Australian defender who played in the National Soccer League
- Mark Jones (footballer, born 1968), English midfielder who played for Walsall, Exeter City and Hereford United
- Mark Jones (footballer, born 1979), English striker who played for Wolves, Cheltenham, Chesterfield and Raith Rovers
- Mark Jones (footballer, born 1984), Welsh international footballer

=== Other sports ===
- Mark Jones (sportscaster) (born 1961), Canadian sportscaster for ESPN and ABC
- Mark Jones (basketball, born 1961), American NBA basketball player for the New Jersey Nets
- Mark Jones (rugby, born 1965) (1965–2025), Wales international rugby union, and rugby league footballer
- Mark Jones (darts player) (born 1970), English professional darts player
- Mark Jones (basketball, born 1975), American NBA basketball player for the Orlando Magic
- Mark Jones (motocross rider) (born 1979), British professional motocross rider
- Mark Jones (rugby union, born 1979), Wales international rugby union winger
- Mark Jones (American football) (born 1980), American football wide receiver
- Mark Jones (racing driver) (born 1980), British auto racing driver

== Others ==
- Mark Wilson Jones (born 1956), British architect and architectural historian

== See also ==
- Marc Jones (disambiguation)
- Marcus Jones (disambiguation)
