= Marcus Jones =

Marcus Jones may refer to:

== Sportspeople ==
- Marcus Jones (cornerback) (born 1998), American football cornerback
- Marcus Jones (athlete) (born 1973), American martial arts fighter and former American football defensive end
- Marcus Jones (baseball) (born 1975), former American Major League Baseball pitcher
- Marcus Jones (footballer) (born 1974), English football defender

== Other people ==
- Marcus Jones (politician) (born 1974), MP for Nuneaton, Warwickshire, England
- Marquis D. Jones Jr., State of New Jersey Superior Court Judge
- Marcus E. Jones (1852–1934), American geologist

== See also ==
- Marc Jones (disambiguation)
- Mark Jones (disambiguation)
