= Anna V. Brown =

African American advocate for the elderly

- Born: 1914; Vivian, West Virginia, U.S.
- Died: November 12, 1985 (aged 70–71); Cleveland, Ohio, U.S.
- Education: Oberlin College
- Occupation: Aging advocate
- Years active: 1941–1984
- Spouse(s): Elmer Brown, m. 1943

Anna V. Brown (1914 – November 12, 1985) was an African-American advocate for the elderly who assisted Mayor Carl Stokes in developing aging programs in Cleveland, Ohio, in the 1970s. She was inducted into the Ohio Department of Aging Hall of Fame and served as the president of the National Council on Aging.

== Biography ==
Anna V. Brown was born in 1914 in Vivian, West Virginia, to physician Joseph E. Brown and his wife Hattie. In 1938, she graduated from Oberlin College and following graduation went on a tour of India. She was the recipient of the Juliette Derricotte Scholarship in 1939, which awarded her the trip, as part of a program initiated by Sue Bailey Thurman to honor outstanding students. After her trip abroad, Brown and her family moved to Cleveland, where she began working in 1941 for the Phillis Wheatley Association (PWA). The Association offered recreational facilities for social events and youth programs, such as dance and music lessons, as well as a day-care facility for working mothers. Brown began as an auditor and worked her way up to the assistant executive secretary of the organization.

In addition to her work at PWA, she began managing her father's physician practice in 1946. There, she became aware of issues that faced aging patients. In February 1971, she was appointed by Cleveland Mayor Carl Stokes as the executive of the Commission on Aging. She began by organizing a list of services for the elderly, developed heating and transport response programs, programs to check on elders living alone, and many other innovations. In two years she generated in $2 million in revenues. In 1981, the Commission became a Department of the City Government.

Brown participated in the White House Conferences on Aging between 1971 and 1981. In 1977, she was inducted into the Ohio Department of Aging Hall of Fame. In 1984, she became president of the National Council on Aging and served as a consultant to the Congressional Black Caucus Brain Trust. A member of many local organizations, Brown was recognized for her advocacy. She received honorary degrees from Oberlin College and Miami University (1985).

Brown's lifetime work improving the lives of older adults was recognized with the establishment of the Anna V. Brown Community Forum. Community partners including the City of Cleveland Department of Aging, Cleveland State University, Cuyahoga County Division of Senior and Adult Services, and Western Reserve Area Agency on Aging conducted the annual event for 27 years. The event focused on the well-being of older adults, emerging issues, and effective practices that assisted with sustaining the lives of older adults. In addition, Brown mentored, coached, and inspired several individuals to pursue careers in gerontology.

She died on November 12, 1985, in Cleveland.

== Personal life ==
Brown married artist Elmer Brown, on June 7, 1943. He painted the Freedom Mural at the City Club of Cleveland and worked for American Greetings as an artist.
