= Music Building =

Music building may refer to:

- Music Building (University of Pittsburgh), a historic building that houses the music department of the University of Pittsburgh
- MarAbel B. Frohnmayer Music Building, the home of the School of Music and Dance at the University of Oregon in Eugene, Oregon
- Music Building (Toronto), a building at Exhibition Place on the Toronto shore of Lake Ontario
- The Music Building, a music rehearsal facility in New York City
- Jacqueline Du Pré Music Building, at St Hilda's College, Oxford
- Voxman Music Building, at the University of Iowa in Iowa City, Iowa
- Wolfe Music Building, in Cleveland, Ohio
