= William E. Smith (artist) =

American artist

- Born: 1913; Chattanooga, Tennessee, U.S.
- Died: 1997 (disputed); California, U.S.
- Education: John Huntington Polytechnic Institute, Cleveland, Ohio; Cleveland Institute of Art, Cleveland, Ohio; Hal Cooper's School of Advertisement, Cleveland, Ohio; Chouinard Art Institute, Los Angeles, California

William "Skinny" Elijah Smith (1913–1997) was an African-American artist who was recognized for exploring Black experiences in his art. Friend and poet Langston Hughes once described Smith's work as the "humor and pathos of Negro life captured in line and color".

== Early life and education ==
William E. Smith was born in 1913 in Chattanooga, Tennessee. Shortly after the death of his mother, Smith moved to Cleveland, Ohio in 1927 along with his two younger siblings, to join his father. As a result of his father's opposition to his artistic aspirations, Smith left home in 1932, where he learned about the hardships and struggles of everyday life in Cleveland.

Surviving on only twenty cents a day and living in the basement of Central Avenue's Grand Central Theatre, Smith was discovered by two Oberlin graduates, Russell and Rowena Jelliffe, founders of what is now considered to be Karamu House. After earning the five year Gilpin Players' Scholarship, Smith attended the John Huntington Polytechnic Institute in Cleveland from 1935 to 1940. It was during the time of Smith's studies at the institute that he began showing in the Cleveland Museum of Art's annual May Show, where his work was exhibited on and off between 1936 and 1949. Smith also went on to further studies at Hal Cooper's School of Advertisement (later known as the Cooper School of Art), the Cleveland School of Art (today known as the Cleveland Institute of Art) and the Chouinard Art Institute in Los Angeles.

== Artistic career ==
=== Early work ===
In the early 1930s, Smith began his studies at Karamu House under the leadership of Karamu House Studio director Richard R. Beatty. A lithographer trained at the Carnegie Institute of Art and The School of The Art Institute of Chicago, Beatty served as Smith's mentor affording him the opportunity to explore the various techniques and styles of printmaking. With Beatty's influence in 1932, Smith became an instructor of the arts of Karamu House Studios. Continuing his apprenticeship, Smith attended Saturday morning classes at the Cleveland Museum under the teachings of artist Paul Travis.

Having designed numerous stage sets and posters and produced more than 30 costume designs at Karamu House, the most notable being his costume designs for Shirley Graham Du Bois' opera, Tom Tom: An Epic of Music and the Negro (1932). Smith was awarded a five-year Gilpin Scholarship to attend the John Huntington Polytechnic Institute from academic years 1935 to 1940. Some notable alumni of the institute were artists Charles L. Sallée Jr., Hughie Lee-Smith, and Elmer Brown.

=== Karamu Artists Inc. and World War II ===
Between 1938 and 1940, Smith participated in 19 exhibitions as part of a group with Karamu Artists Incorporated. The organization was a professional network that was formally established in 1940. Art critic and artist Grace V. Kelly wrote of the new integration of the organization and purpose for its members in the Cleveland Plain Dealer:

[...] the dual purpose of bringing [the work its members] before the publicans of acquainting the community and the nation with the merits of Negro artists and craftsmen in all our centers of art.

However, the organization was short-lived after the mobilization for World War II began. Several of its core members like: Smith, Lee-Smith, Sallée, Brown, Fred Carlo, and Thomas Usher were dispersed shortly after. Smith served as a WWII assistant photographer in the army's educational department.

=== After World War II and California ===
Following his army service in 1946, Smith continued his art education in illustration, advertising, and opened his own graphic arts studio. Smith later became an art director for an advertising agency in the late 1940s. After the death of his brother in 1949, Smith moved to Los Angeles, California, to be near his sister.

In Los Angeles, Smith associated with his former colleague from Karamu House, Curtis Tann. Together, Smith and Tann cofounded the Eleven Associated Artists Gallery, the first Los Angeles gallery devoted specifically to African-American art. In the early 1950s, Smith was hired as a blueprint draftsman in the sign design division at Lockheed Corporation, allowing him to continue to pursue teaching and his own art. From 1956 to 1960, Smith continued his studies at the Chouinard Art Institute. As Smith broadened his education in 1960, he also cofounded Art West Associated, a professional black artists organization. Reporter William C. Roberson writes of the purpose and success the organization replicates for its members in an article of the Call and Post,

Smith is a member of a professional black art group "Art West Association Inc." A group that has moved as a force to get their art works displayed at the Los Angeles County Museum[...] The group founded in 1960 has displayed its work throughout Los Angeles. In banks, churches, private homes and concerts in a massive effort to enlighten the public to the expertise of black artists.

In the early 1970s, Smith continued to pursue art by publishing illustrations of subjects from African-American history for Cleveland's New Day Press. In his lifetime, Smith won many awards and accolades for his work and philanthropy. In 1976, Karamu organized a retrospective of his work, titled From Umbrella Staves to Brush and Easel.

== Selected exhibitions ==
- 1936–49: Cleveland May Show
- 1935–41: Cleveland Museum of Art, Cleveland, Ohio
- 1939: Dayton Art Institute
- 1938: Connecticut Academy of Fine Arts
- 1940: American Negro Exposition
- 1942: Association of American Artists Galleries
- 1943: Library of Congress
- 1942: Atlanta University
- 1966–8: National Academy of Design
- 1968: Oakland Museum
- 1969: Atlanta University
- 1996: Cleveland State University, Cleveland, Ohio
- 1996–7: The Butler Institute of American Art, Youngstown, Ohio
- 1997: Riffe Gallery, Columbus, Ohio
- Denver Art Museum
- Fyre Museum
- Benedict Art Gallery, Chicago (one-person exhibition)
- Lyman Brothers Gallery, Indianapolis (one-person exhibition)
- YMCA, Los Angeles (one-person exhibition)
- Florenz Gallery, Los Angeles (one-person exhibition)

== Selected collections ==
- Cleveland Museum of Art, Cleveland, Ohio
- Cleveland State University, Cleveland, Ohio
- Golden State Insurance Co., Los Angeles
- Howard University, Washington, D.C.
- Karamu House, Cleveland, Ohio
- Library of Congress, Washington, D.C.
- Oakland Museum, Oakland, California
- The Metropolitan Museum of Art, New York

== Selected works ==
| Year | Title | Collection | Medium |
|---|---|---|---|
| 1937 | Mother and Baby | The Cleveland Museum of Art | Linocut |
| 1940 | Sharecropper | The Cleveland Museum of Art | Linocut |
| 1941 | My Son! My Son! | The Cleveland Museum of Art | Linocut |
| 1943 | Siesta | The Cleveland Museum of Art | Linocut |
| 1937 | Poker Game | Cleveland State University, The Jelliffe Collection, Michael Schwartz Library Special Collections | Linocut |
| 1938 | Nobody Knows | Cleveland State University, The Jelliffe Collection, Michael Schwartz Library Special Collections | Linocut |
| 1940 | Whistling Boy | Cleveland State University, The Jelliffe Collection, Michael Schwartz Library Special Collections | Linocut |
| 1941 | Portrait | Cleveland State University, The Jelliffe Collection, Michael Schwartz Library Special Collections | Graphite on Paper |
| 1938 | Native Son | The Metropolitan Museum of Art | Linocut |
| 1938 | The Lamppost | The Metropolitan Museum of Art | Linocut (Edition 19/20) |
| 1940 | War Fatigue | The Metropolitan Museum of Art | Linocut (Edition 9/11) |
| 1940 | Poverty and Fatigue | The Metropolitan Museum of Art | Linocut (Edition 10/70) |
