= Paul A. Kerschner =

American gerontologist (1942–1994)

Paul A. Kerschner (1942-1994) was an American gerontologist.

== Biography ==
Born in New York, he obtained his undergraduate degree from California State University, Fullerton, and completed his master's in public administration and doctorate in gerontology at the University of Southern California (USC).

From 1978 to 1984, he held the position of associate director for the American Association of Retired Persons in Washington. He then served as director at the National Foundation for Long-Term Health Care from 1985 to 1989 and as senior vice-president at the National Council on Aging from 1989 to 1992. By 1992, he became affiliated with the Gerontological Society of America.

Earlier in his career, Kerschner was an associate director at the Ethel Percy Andrus Gerontology Center at USC and volunteered for the Peace Corps in Nigeria between 1965 and 1967. He also chaired the Coalition for Consumer Protection/Quality in Health Care Reform.

Kerschner died in 1994 at the age of 52.
