= Hank Berger =

Former American nightclub owner and merchandiser

- Born: 1952
- Died: October 31, 2006 (aged 53–54); Cleveland, Ohio, US
- Occupation(s): Nightclub owner, merchandiser
- Spouse: Shelley
- Children: 2 sons

Hank Berger (1952 – October 31, 2006) was an American nightclub owner and merchandiser.

After a stint in the Navy, Berger enrolled in the Cooper School of Art.

Later, Berger helmed a series of successful Cleveland nightclubs, including the pioneering gay disco "Traxx" and "Phantasy Nightclub". He became known as "Dr. Disco". In having opened, operated, and brokered the sale of these clubs, Berger is credited with pioneering the development of "the Rock n' Roll capital of the world's neighborhood of 'The Flats'".

In c. 1980, Berger merchandised the remnants of the old Hollywood sign after it was replaced by a replica. In 2005, he gave up on marketing the discarded cultural icon in pieces, and sold it for $450,000 to a man named Dan Bliss.

Berger died on October 31, 2006, in Cleveland, Ohio, at the age of 55 of asthma-related problems four days after having been hospitalized.
