= Karamu House =

- U.S. National Register of Historic Places
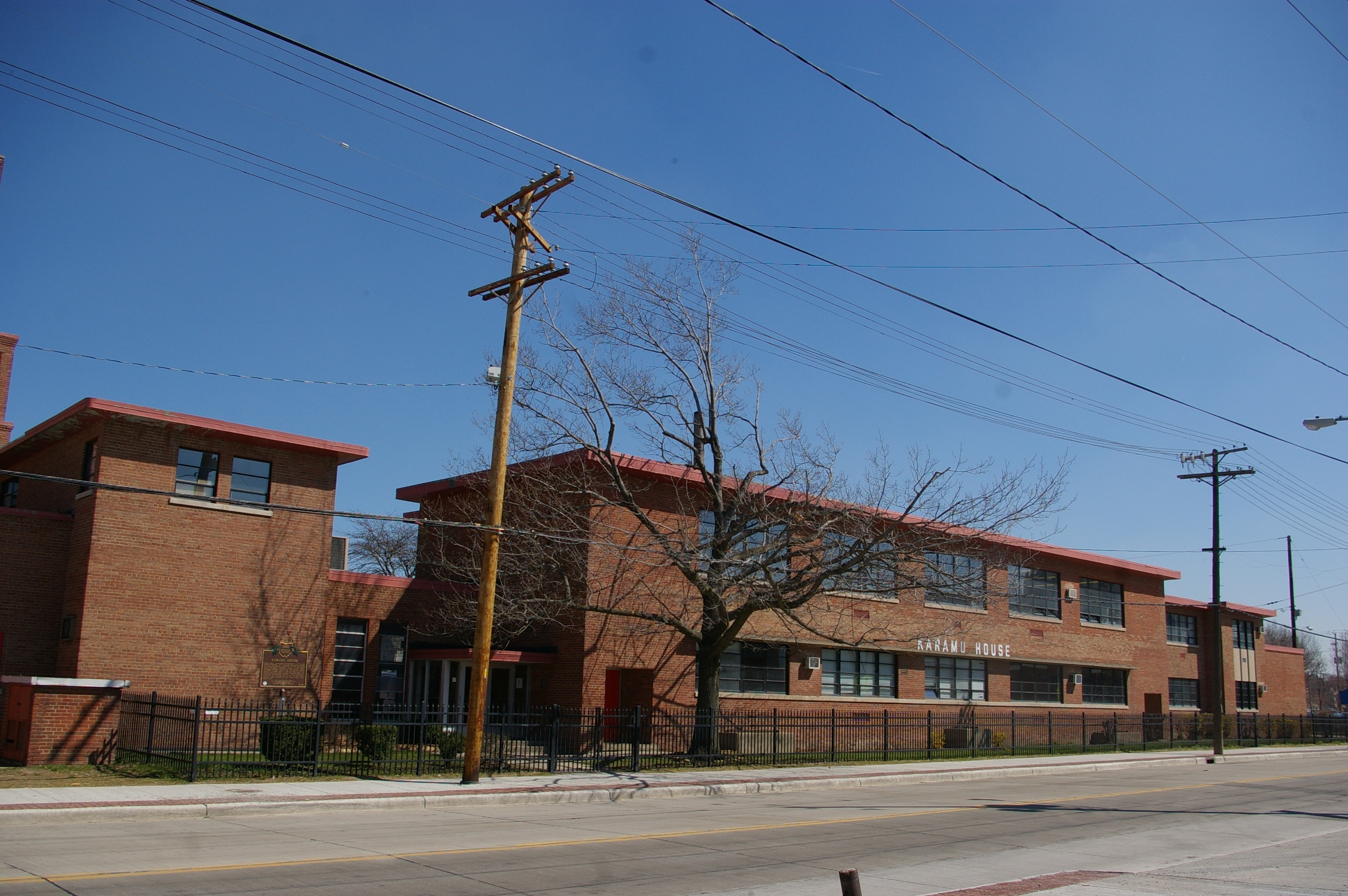
- Karamu House

- Location within Ohio
- Location: Cleveland, Ohio, United States
- Coordinates: 41°29′38″N 81°37′27″W
- Built: -1915 (as Settlement House) -1941 (renamed as Karamu House)
- Architectural style: Moderne
- Website: karamuhouse.org
- MPS: Black History TR
- NRHP reference No.: 82001368
- Added to NRHP: December 17, 1982

Karamu House in the Fairfax neighborhood on the east side of Cleveland, Ohio, United States, is the oldest producing Black Theatre in the United States opening in 1915. Many of Langston Hughes's plays were developed and premiered at the theater.

== History ==
In 1915, Russell and Rowena Woodham Jelliffe, graduates of Oberlin College in nearby Oberlin, Ohio, founded what was then called The Neighborhood Association at 2239 E. 38th St.; establishing it as a place where people of all races, creeds, and religions could find common ground. The Jelliffes discovered in their early years, that the arts provided the common ground, and in 1917 plays at the "Playhouse Settlement" began.

The early twenties saw a large number of African Americans move into an area in Cleveland, from the Southern United States. Resisting pressure to exclude their new neighbors, the Jelliffes insisted that all races were welcome. They used the United States Declaration of Independence; "all men are created equal". What was then called the Playhouse Settlement quickly became a magnet for some of the best African American artists of the day. Actors, dancers, print makers and writers all found a place where they could practice their crafts. Karamu was also a contributor to the Harlem Renaissance, and Langston Hughes roamed the halls.

Reflecting the strength of the Black influence on its development, the Playhouse Settlement was officially renamed Karamu House in 1941. Karamu is a word in the Kiswahili language meaning "a place of joyful gathering".

Karamu House had developed a reputation for nurturing black actors having carried on the mission of the Gilpin Players, a black acting troupe whose heyday predated Karamu. Directors such as John Kenley, of the Kenley Players, and John Price, of Musicarnival — a music "tent" theater located in Warrensville Heights, Ohio, a Cleveland suburb — recruited black actors for their professional productions.

In 1931, Langston Hughes, and Zora Neale Hurston were negotiating with the Jelliffes to produce Mule Bone, their two act collaboration, when the two writers "fell out". A series of conversations between the Hughes and Hurston estates, the Ethel Barrymore Theatre presented the world premiere of Mule Bone on Broadway in 1991. Finally, sixty-five years after the production was originally proposed, Karamu House presented Mule Bone (The Bone Of Contention) as the 1996–1997 season finale. Karamu's production, directed by Sarah May, played to standing room only audiences in the Proscenium (Jelliffe) Theatre. The by-line in The Plain Dealer, as the Cleveland theatre season came to its end read: "Karamu returns to Harlem Renaissance status". Critic Marianne Evett shared Karamu's success story as the theatre began to recover from past hardships. The revival Karamu House needed so desperately had arrived. During this time, playwright and two time Emmy nominee Margaret Ford-Taylor held the position of executive director, and Sarah May, Director in Residence.

From October 2003 to March 2016, Terrence Spivey was Karamu's artistic director. Tony F. Sias is CEO and President, Aseelah Shareef is COO + Vice President.

== Renovations 2017-2021 ==
In 2017, a major renovation of the facility was undertaken. The architect Robert P. Madison International, Ohio's first African American-owned architectural firm, founded by Cleveland architect Robert P. Madison, led the 14.5 million dollar renovation. This included a new streetscape, bistro, patio, and enclosed outdoor stage; as well as updates to the Arena Theater, lobby, and dressing rooms.

The updates were to be completed in three phases as follows:

- Phase I - Redesign of the 195 seat Jelliffe Theatre with new roof, lobby, seating, lighting, and wheel chair access.
- Phase II - Addition of the KeyBank lobby, gift shop, and Anthony (Tony) Smith Gallery, redesign of the Arena Theatre, and cafe.
- Phase III - Addition of outdoor stage area, patio, cafe, and streetscape.

== Timeline ==
Date	Event	Source
1915	Karamu House is founded	
1917	The "Playhouse Settlement" began	
1936	Premiere of When the Jack Hollars by Langston Hughes	
1936	Premiere of Troubled Island by Langston Hughes	
1941	The "Playhouse Settlement" was renamed "Karamu House"	
1982	Karamu House listed in the U.S. Register of Historic Places	
2003	Karamu House received an Ohio Historical Marker	
2020	Karamu House presents Freedom on Juneteenth	

== Identity ==
Karamu's mission is to "produce professional theatre, provide arts education and present community programs for all people while honoring the Black experience. We are a place of joyful gathering where people from different races, religions, and economic backgrounds come together through the arts." In recent years, the mission was updated from "African-American" to "Black" to be more inclusive the Black experience throughout the diaspora.

== Langston Hughes involvement ==
Langston Hughes had a special relationship with Karamu Theatre and the years 1936-1939 have been called the "Hughes Era.". Born in St. Louis, Hughes early life moved to Cleveland, where he attended Karamu programs and classes; after he left Ohio, he kept in touch with the director, Rowena Jelliffe, and the Gilpin Players, who produced a number of his plays, including the premiers of When the Jack Hollars (1936), Troubled Island (1936), and Joy to My Soul' Once, Hughes even said, "if at [any] time [when I am in Cleveland] I can be of any use, if I can give for you a public (or private) talk or reading, or in any way help to raise money locally, I will be only too happy to do so." In an interview with Reuben Silver of Karamu, Hughes said: "It is a cultural shame that a great country like America, with twenty million people of color, has no primarily serious colored theatre. There isn't. Karamu is the very nearest thing to it...It not only should a Negro theatre, if we want to use that term, do plays by and about Negroes, but it should do plays slanted toward the community in which it exists. It should be in a primarily Negro community since that is the way our racial life in America is still...It should not be a theatre that should be afraid to do a Negro folk play about people who are perhaps not very well-educated because some of the intellectuals, or "intellectuals" in quotes, are ashamed of such material"

By 1940, according to his biographer Arnold Rampersad, "Langston consigned all his skits and sketches, divided into three classes—Negro Social, Negro, Negro Non-Social, and white—to his agent, and told him Cafe Society, an interracial cabaret founded in New York by Barney Josephson, was planning a revue. Hughes sent twenty skits, including, Run, Ghost, Run. He also sent a copy to Karamu; there is no record that the revue was staged there or anywhere. Three of those skits appear here in print for the first time. Throughout his life, Hughes added to the program with many short satirical skits.

== Recent ==
Karamu offers art experiences for people of all ages through a variety of programs. The three primary program areas are the Early Childhood Development Center, the Center of Arts and Education, and the Karamu Performing Arts Theatre.

In 2020, Karamu House presented Freedom on Juneteenth, written by Tony F. Sias, Latecia D Wilson, and Mary E Weems; an event commemorating the end of slavery, June 19, 1865, in the United States. Freedom on Juneteenth originally was created to celebrate the music of Bill Withers, but was adapted due to the passing of George Floyd.

== Awards ==
On December 17, 1982, Karamu was listed in the U.S. National Register of Historic Places, and received an Ohio Historical Marker on June 16, 2003.

- Karamu also received the "Theater Longevity Award" from the National Black Theater Festival in 2005.
- In 2019, American Theater Magazine said that Karamu House is, "...one of the most overlooked success stories in our field."
- In 2022, Karamu received "The Doors of the Theater are Open" Award from "The Awards" formerly known as the Antonyo's by Broadway Black.
- In 2023, Karamu was named the "Best Theater in the Midwest" by Midwest Living magazine.

== Notable alumni ==
Acting

- Bill Cobbs (born June 16, 1934) - film, television, stage, directing, master workshops
- Minnie Gentry (1915–1993) — a Broadway, film and television actress
- Robert Guillaume (1927 - 2017) — a film, stage and television actor best known for starring — in the late 1970s–mid 1980s — in the television situation-comedy series Soap and its spin-off series Benson
- Margaret Ford-Taylor, (born January 6) - film, television, stage, writer, director, two-time Emmy nominee
- Dick Latessa (1929–2016) — a film, stage and television actor who won the 2003 Tony Award for Best Performance by a Featured Actor in a Musical for his role in Hairspray
- Ron O'Neal (1937–2004) — an actor, film director and screenwriter who appeared in many blaxploitation films in the 1970s
- Al Kirk, Broadway and Film Actor "Shaft" "Golden Boy" with Sammy Davis Jr.
- Dave Connell, Broadway and Film Actor "Great White Hope" Five Films also Arena Stage Resident Actor
- Vaness Bell-Calloway, born in 1956. Vanessa performed in Karamu's theater and modern dance departments. She earned a spot in the chorus of the Broadway musical, Dream Girls
- Reyno Crayton (born 8/26/52) performed in numerous Karamu House productions. Additionally, he played Lou Edwards in The Negro Ensemble Production of "The First Breeze of Summer," opening June 1975. In 1975, he won the Clarence Derwent Award and the 1975 OBIE Award, Performance as Lou Edwards in (The First Breeze of Summer).

Visual Artists

- Charles L. Sallée Jr. (1913-2006) - WPA printmaker, painter and muralist who also worked as an interior designer.
- William E. Smith (1913-1997) - WPA printmaker, painter and sign designer who was also an art instructor.
