= Elmer Brown (artist) =

American artist (1909 – 1971)

Elmer W. Brown
- Born: 1909; Pittsburgh, Pennsylvania
- Died: May 30, 1971 (aged 61); Cleveland, Ohio
- Resting place: Martha's Vineyard

Elmer William Brown (1909 – May 30, 1971) was an African-American artist. He worked in multiple mediums, including painting, printmaking, murals, stage design, ceramics, and enameling.

== Biography ==
Elmer Brown was born in Pittsburgh, Pennsylvania and went to school in Columbus, Ohio. He moved to Cleveland, Ohio in 1929, when he was 20, and studied with artist Paul Travis at the Cleveland School of Art. Shortly after arriving in Cleveland, he became affiliated with Karamu House, where he became friends with Langston Hughes. He assisted with the production of Hughes's plays at Karamu House, and created artwork for lounges there. He exhibited prints at international exhibitions in New York City and Philadelphia, and displayed works several times in the Cleveland Museum of Art's May Show.

Brown's best-known works are his Works Progress Administration murals. In 1940, he painted two murals known as Cleveland Past and Cleveland Present for the Cleveland Metropolitan Housing Authority's Valleyview Homes project in Cleveland's Tremont neighborhood. When the complex was razed in 2005, the murals were removed and restored by the Intermuseum Conservation Association, and in 2010, were reinstalled in a ballroom at Cleveland State University's student center. Reproductions were hung at Tremont Pointe, CMHA's replacement of the Valleyview Homes. In 1942, he created a mural for the City Club of Cleveland titled Freedom of Speech. The 22-foot (6.7 m) by 11-foot (3.4 m) mural, inspired by the work of Diego Rivera and other Mexican muralists, features muscular men and important documents of freedom, including Magna Carta, the United States Bill of Rights, the United States Declaration of Independence and the United States Constitution. It was relocated several times when the City Club moved to new locations, and was restored by a team headed by Gail Berg of Berg and Associates. When the City Club moved to Playhouse Square in 2023, they donated the mural to the Western Reserve Historical Society, where it will be put on display.

Brown became the first African-American illustrator at American Greetings in 1953, and he worked there for 18 years. He also taught at the Cooper School of Art in Cleveland. In 1971, he died at the Cleveland Clinic after a long illness. He was survived by his wife, Anna V. Brown, and was buried in Martha's Vineyard.

== See also ==
- List of African-American visual artists
