= Scott Miller (artist) =

American painter

- Born: December 24, 1955; Ohio, U.S.
- Died: May 18, 2008 (aged 52); Cleveland, Ohio
- Education: Cooper School of Art (1974–1978); Cleveland Institute of Art (1980–1983)
- Known for: "Subjects, figures, flowering botany, surrealist dream images"

Scott Miller (December 24, 1955 – May 18, 2008) was an American painter based in Cleveland, Ohio.

The Cleveland Museum of Art characterized Miller and his art this way:

Miller belonged to a generation of postmodern artists inspired by cartoons and graffiti. Untitled, which features a male figure floating amid viscera and accompanied by animals, suggests vulnerability and mortality, and the concept of one’s place in the universe. The artist’s imagery during this period likely references his identity as a gay man living through the deadliest years of the AIDS pandemic.

== Education and career ==
Miller graduated from Fairview High School in Fairview Park, Ohio. He studied from 1974 to 1978 at the Cooper School of Art and at the Cleveland Institute of Art from 1980 to 1983.

== Exhibitions ==
=== Solo exhibitions ===
==== 1980–1989 ====
- Weller/Potosky Gallery - Toronto, Canada
- Aquilon - Cleveland, Ohio
- Midtown Gallery - Cleveland, Ohio
- Summer Gallery - Cleveland, Ohio
- Art Site Gallery - Cleveland, Ohio
- Kent State Center Gallery - Kent, Ohio
- Karamu Gallery - Cleveland, Ohio
- Joyce Porcelli Gallery - Cleveland, Ohio
- Artemesia Gallery - Chicago, Illinois

==== 1990–1999 ====
- The Akron Museum of Art - Akron, Ohio
- Art Lick Gallery - San Francisco, California
- Art in the Powerhouse - Cleveland, Ohio
- Cleveland Independent Art - Cleveland, Ohio
- OBOE Gallery - Cleveland, Ohio
- Aquilon - Cleveland, Ohio

==== 2000–2008 ====
- Don O'Mellveny Gallery - Los Angeles, California
- Herb Ascherman Gallery - Cleveland, Ohio
- OBOE Gallery - Cleveland, Ohio
- Art Metro Gallery - Cleveland, Ohio
- Klapper Gallery - Los Angeles, California
- Edgar Varela Fine Arts - Los Angeles, California

=== Group exhibitions ===
==== 1980–1989 ====
- The Cleveland Museum of Art - Cleveland, Ohio
- Weller/Potosky Gallery - Toronto, Canada
- Spaces/Hallwalls - Buffalo, New York
- Artists' Society International - San Francisco, California
- James Hunt Barker Gallery - Palm Beach, Florida
- Lucky Street Gallery - Key West, Florida
- Cleveland Center for Contemporary Art - Cleveland, Ohio
- N.O.V.A. - Cleveland, Ohio
- Spaces Gallery - Cleveland, Ohio
- The New Figuration - Cleveland, Ohio

==== 1990–1999 ====
- The Cleveland Museum of Art - Cleveland, Ohio
- Midtown Gallery - Cleveland, Ohio
- World Tattoo Gallery - New York, NY
- Penson Gallery - New York, NY
- Feature Gallery - New York, NY
- Evanston Art Center - Evanston, Illinois
- Artemesia Gallery - Chicago, Illinois
- Hyde Park Institute - Chicago, Illinois

==== 2000–2008 ====
- Toyoda Museum - Nagoya, Japan
- William Merrill Gallery - Laguna Beach, California
- Gallery 33 - Long Beach, California
- Don O'Melveny Gallery - Los Angeles, California
- Cast Iron Gallery - New York, NY

== Prominent collectors ==
- Peter Lewis - Philanthropist
- Richard Armstrong - Director, Solomon R. Guggenheim Museum
- Hugh Hefner/Playboy Enterprises
- Henry Hawley - Head Curator, Cleveland Museum of Art
- Progressive Insurance Corporation
- Flemming Flindt - Choreographer
- Akron Museum of Art
- BP
- Allen Ginsberg - Poet
