= Walker and Weeks =

Architecture firm based in Cleveland

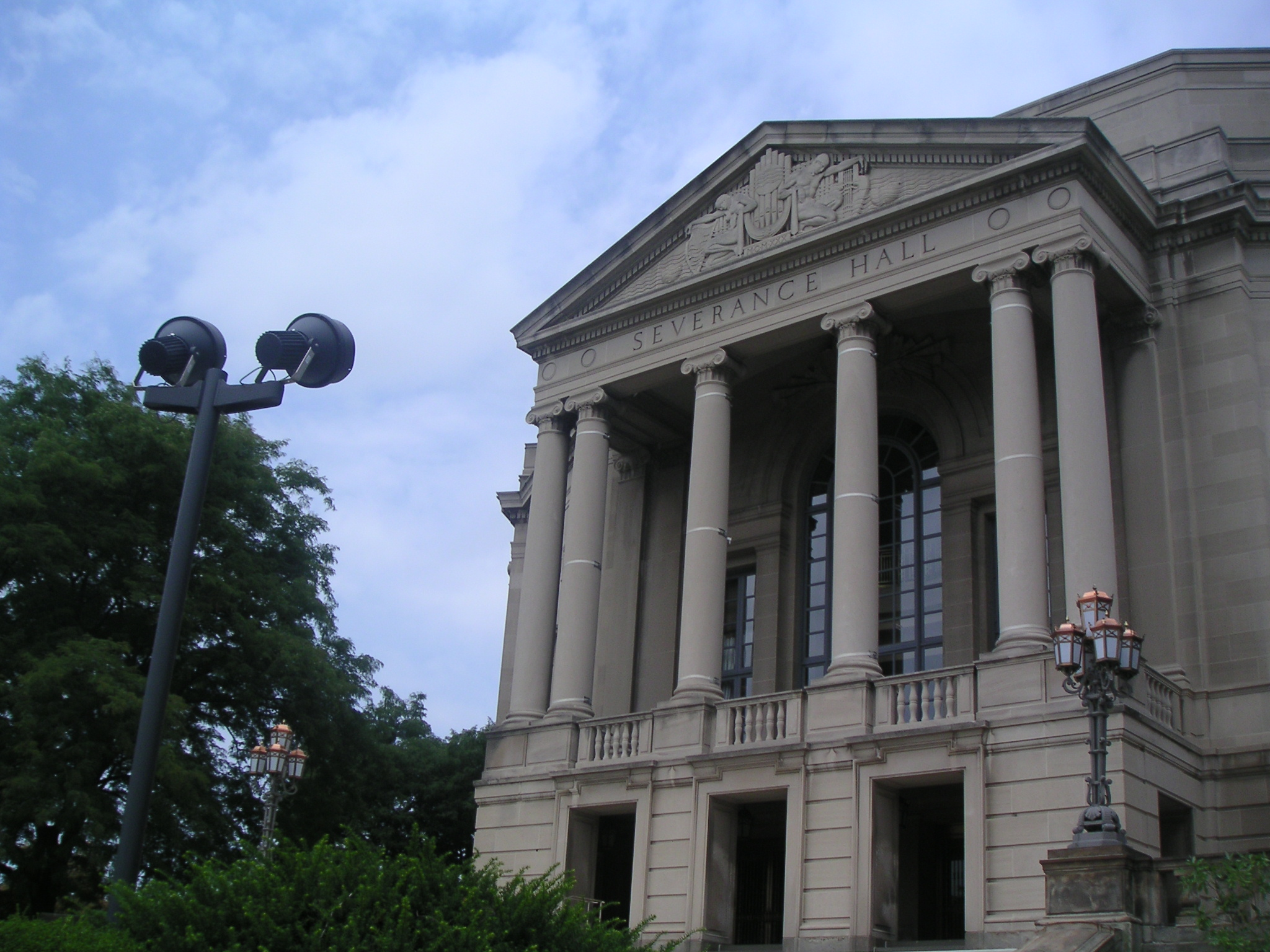
Severance Hall

Walker and Weeks was an architecture firm based in Cleveland, Ohio, founded by Frank Ray Walker (September 29, 1877 - July 9, 1949) and Harry E. Weeks (October 2, 1871 - December 21, 1935).

== Background ==
Harry Weeks was born October 2, 1871, in W. Springfield, MA, the son of Charles F. and Clarissa Allen Weeks. He attended MIT where he studied architecture in the Beaux-Arts tradition, graduating in 1893. He then worked for several prominent Massachusetts architectural firms before owning his own firm in Pittsfield, MA, for 3 years, where he would meet his future business partner. At the suggestion of John M. Carrere, a member of the Cleveland Group Plan Commission, Weeks moved to Cleveland in 1905, where he went to work for the prominent Cleveland architect J. Milton Dyer (1870–1957).

Frank Walker was born September 29, 1877, in Pittsfield, MA, the son of Frank and Helen Theresa (Ranous) Walker. He also studied architecture in the beaux-arts tradition at MIT, from which he was graduated in 1900. He subsequently moved to France to study at the Atelier of Monsieur Redon in Paris, and then lived a year in Italy. He returned to practice architecture in Boston, New York, and Pittsburgh before moving to Cleveland in 1905 to work for the firm of J. Milton Dyer.

After working together in Dyer's office, Walker and Weeks opened their own practice in 1911; the office continued to produce work even after Weeks's death, until the early 1950s. As was often the case with architecture firms, Walker was the designer while Weeks was primarily the businessman.

== Works ==
The firm is most noted for its bank buildings; several dozen were designed in the teens alone. Their best-known bank was the Federal Reserve Bank of Cleveland, built in 1923. However, they also designed a wide variety of commercial, public, ecclesiastic and residential buildings, as well as a number of bridges, during the course of the firm's life. Walker and Weeks were responsible for the Indiana World War Memorial Plaza in Indianapolis, which features a cenotaph based on the Mausoleum of Maussollos.

Walker and Weeks frequently employed sculptor Henry Hering to create sculpture for their projects.

Like many architects the firm produced work in a variety of styles, from Neoclassical, Italian Renaissance and finally, the 1930s, ending in Moderne and/or Art Deco.

== Notable buildings ==
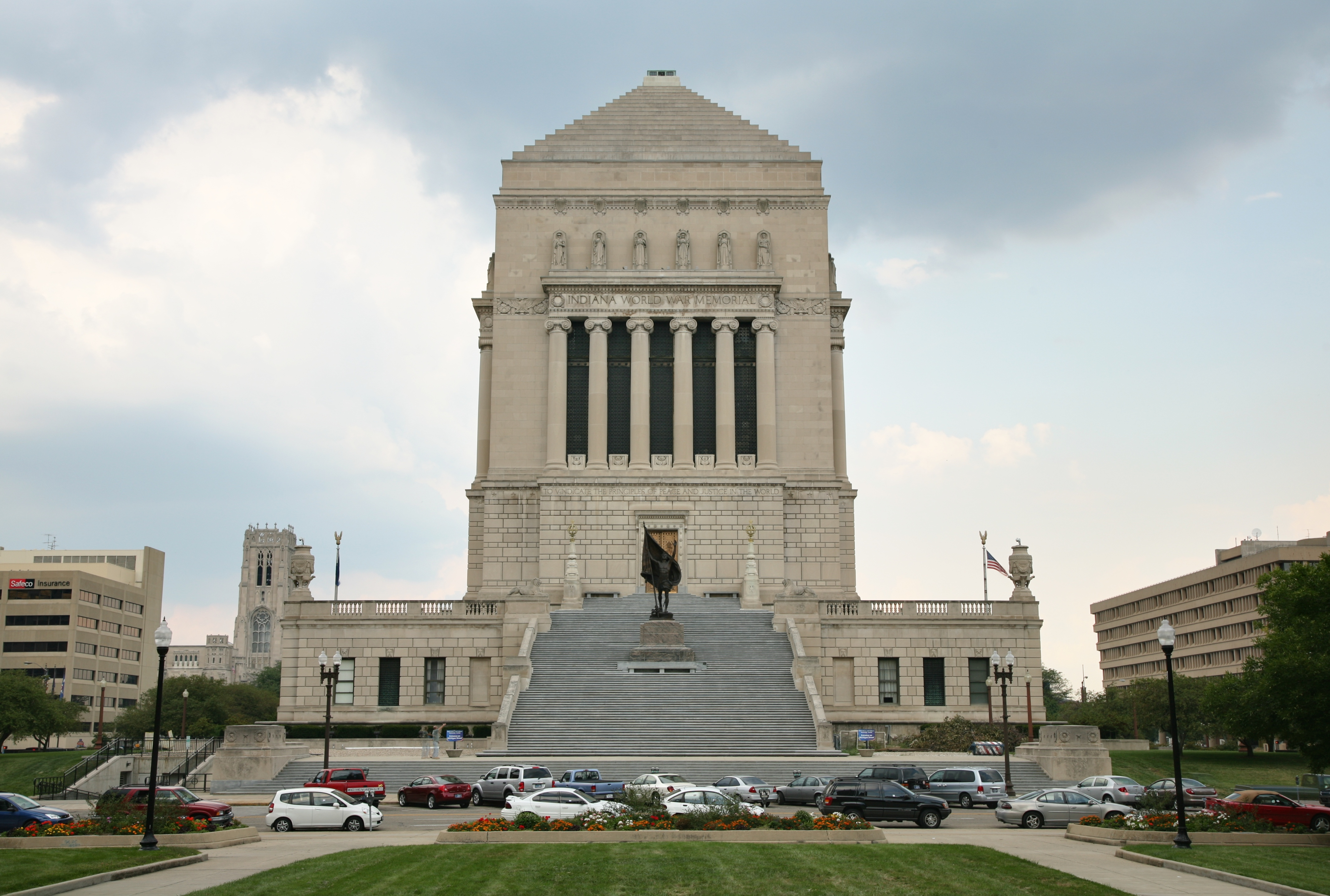
The Indiana World War Memorial

The buildings designed by the firm include:

- Lorain County Savings and Loan Building, Elyria, Ohio, 1916
- First National Bank of Cleveland, Cleveland, 1917
- Goodyear Tire and Rubber Company Building, Akron, Ohio, 1917
- Steubenville Bank and Trust Building, Steubenville, Ohio, 1919
- Public Auditorium, Cleveland, 1922
- Superior Building, Cleveland, 1922
- Federal Reserve Bank of Cleveland, Cleveland, 1923
- Tate House, Tate, Georgia, 1923
- Cleveland Public Library Building, Cleveland, 1925
- Old National Bank Building, Lima, Ohio, 1925
- Allen Memorial Medical Library, Cleveland, 1926
- Indiana World War Memorial, Indianapolis, Indiana, 1927
- Thirty-seventh Division Memorial Bridge, Eyne, Belgium, 1927
- Wolfe Music Building, Cleveland, 1927
- Epworth-Euclid Methodist Church (with Bertram Goodhue), Cleveland, 1928
- St. Paul's Episcopal Church, Cleveland Heights, Ohio 1928
- First Baptist Church, Shaker Heights, Ohio, 1928
- First Church of Christ, Scientist, Cleveland, 1929
- Municipal Stadium, Cleveland, 1931
- Severance Hall, Cleveland, 1931
- Federal Reserve Bank of Cleveland - Pittsburgh Branch, Pittsburgh, 1931
- Central Branch of the Evansville Public Library, Indiana, 1932
- Hope Memorial Bridge (Originally the Lorain-Carnegie Bridge), Cleveland, 1932
- Tomlinson Hall, Case Institute of Technology, Cleveland, 1945
- Highland View Hospital, Highland Hills, Ohio, 1952
- Saint Ann Church, Cleveland Heights, Ohio, 1952
