= Gloria Plevin =

American painter and print maker (born 1934)

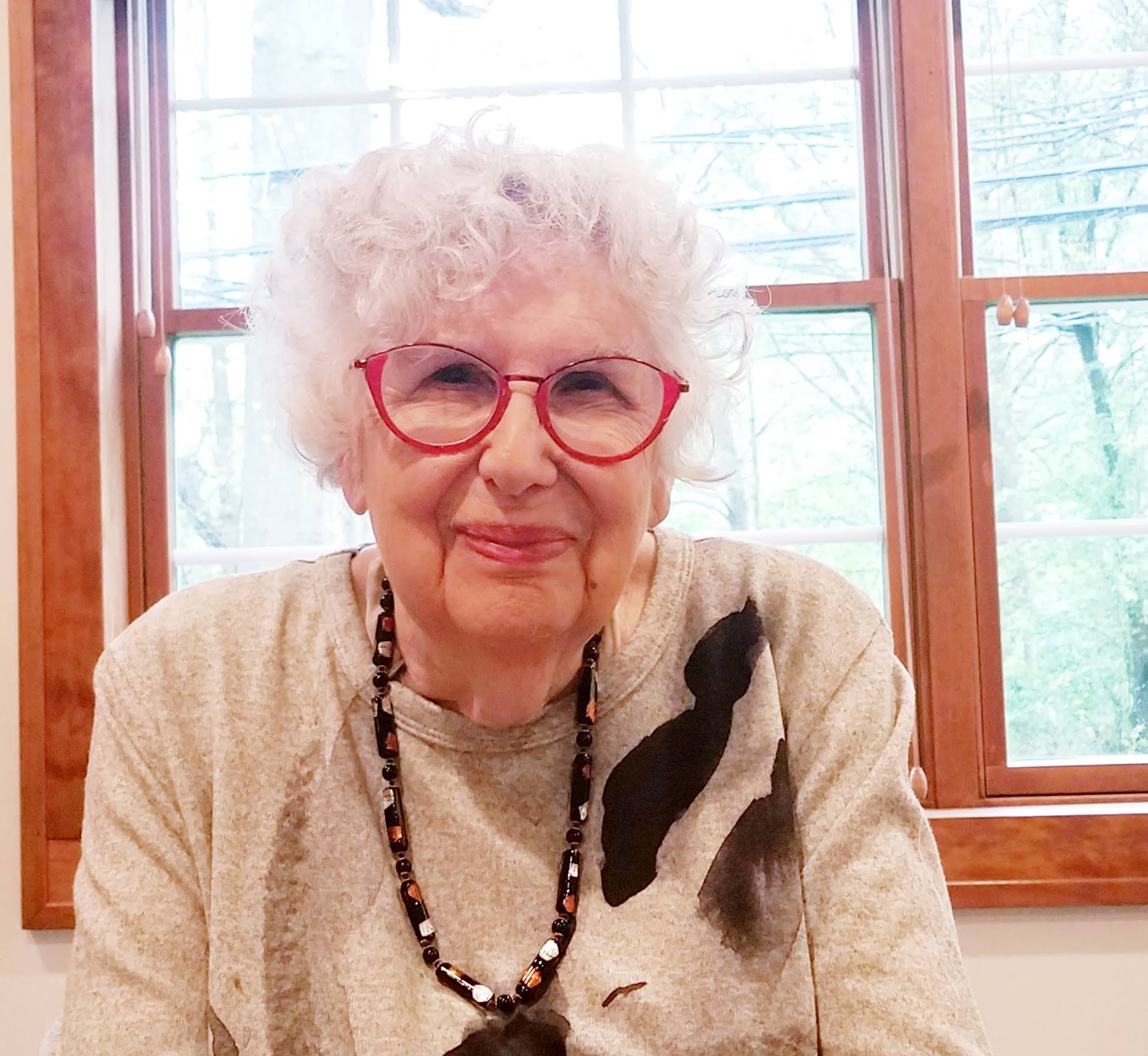
- Gloria Plevin in 2021
- Born: Gloria Rosenthal Plevin; July 25, 1934 (age 92); Pittsburgh, Pennsylvania
- Education: Ohio University
- Known for: Painting; Printmaking

Gloria Rosenthal Plevin (born July 25, 1934) is an American painter and print-maker living and working in Northeast Ohio. She works in watercolors, pastels, acrylics and monoprints and is best known for her realistic renderings.

== Biography ==
Plevin was born in Pittsburgh, Pennsylvania on July 25, 1934. She was raised in Clarksburg, West Virginia, and graduated from Washington Irving High School in 1952. She received an associate degree from Ohio University in 1954. When she was thirty years old with young children at home, she began pursuing a painting career. At a time when the art world was favoring abstract expressionism and geometric expression, Plevin stayed true to her realistic style. Her need for technical information and experience with materials and tools of art, led her to classes at the Cooper School of Art, and the Cleveland Institute of Art. Thelma Frazier Winter and Moe Brooker were among her teachers.

Plevin first received public recognition of her work in 1973 when she received the "Helen Logan Award" for Traditional Painting for her father-in-law's portrait in the Chautauqua National Juried Show. In 1985, she opened her own gallery in Chautauqua, New York.

Over time, Plevin's content moved from portraits and still-life to gardens and landscapes.

Her first museum-curated show was held in 1993 at the Butler Institute of American Art, then located in Salem, Ohio. In 1999, Plevin received the Governor's Award from the Ohio Arts Council.

== Selected exhibitions ==
- 1973 Chautauqua National Juried Show, Chautauqua Art Association Galleries, Chautauqua, NY
- 1974 Butler Institute of American Art Mid-Year Painting Show, Butler Institute of American Art, Youngstown, OH
- 1981 Women Artists Look at Men, Beck Center for the Arts, Lakewood, OH
- 1987 Gloria Plevin, Karamu House Gallery, Cleveland, OH
- 1988 American Drawing Biennial, Muscarelle Museum of Art, College of William and Mary, Williamsburg, VA
- 1993 Chautauqua Still Lifes and Vistas, Butler Institute of American Art, Salem, OH
- 1998 Women Artists of Northeast Ohio, Beck Center for the Arts, Lakewood, OH
- 1999 First Ohio Print Biennial, Beck Center for the Arts, Lakewood, OH
- 2004 Parallel Lives, Florence O'Donnell Wasmer Gallery, Ursuline College, Pepper Pike, OH
- 2008 Gloria Plevin: Prints, Zygote Press, Cleveland, OH
- 2012 Portraits in Nature: Paintings and Works on Paper, West Virginia University, Morgantown, WV
- 2016 The Flowering of the Botanical Print], Cleveland Museum of Art, Cleveland, OH
- 2016 Nature as Muse, Artists Archives of the Western Reserve, Cleveland, OH
- 2018 Gloria Plevin: A Life in Art, ARTneo: The Museum of Northeast Ohio, Cleveland, OH
- 2018 City Artists at Work & Rest, Mansfield Art Center, Mansfield, OH
- 2019 Gloria Plevin, Gallery at Moreland Courts, Cleveland, OH
- 2020 Gloria Plevin: Portraits of Flowers, Shaker Nature Center Art Gallery, Shaker Heights, OH
- 2021 Women of the Archives, Judson Manor, Cleveland, OH
- 2022 Heights Arts Members Show, Heights Arts Gallery, Cleveland Heights, OH
- 2022 Members Exhibition, Artists Archives of the Western Reserve, Cleveland, OH
- 2023 Passion for Nature: The Art of Gloria Plevin and Ron Johnston, Judson Park Gallery, Cleveland, OH

== Selected collections ==
- Cleveland Museum of Art
- ARTneo: The Museum of Northeast Ohio Art
- Burchfield Penney Art Center
- Butler Institute of American Art
- Art Museum of West Virginia University
