= Marc Jones =

Marc Jones may refer to:

- Marc Edmund Jones (1888–1980), American astrologer
- Marc Jones (rugby union) (born 1987), Welsh rugby union player
- Marc Jones (police commissioner) (born 1972), English politician and Police and Crime Commissioner for Lincolnshire
- Marc Jones (Welsh politician), member of the Senedd

== See also ==
- Mark Jones (disambiguation)
- Marcus Jones (disambiguation)
