= First Church of Christ, Scientist (Cleveland) =

Historic church in Ohio, United States

- U.S. National Register of Historic Places
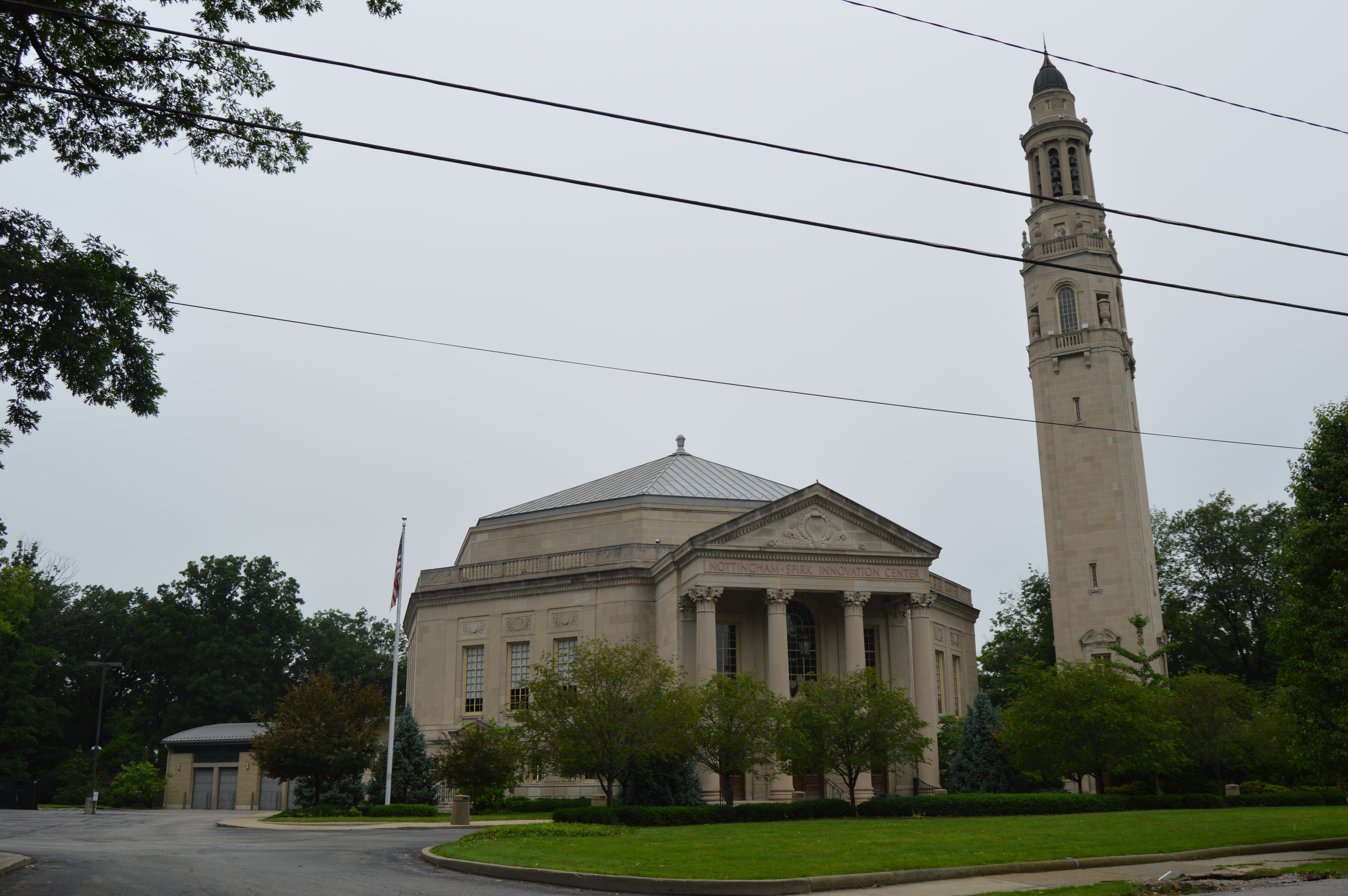
- Roadside view

- Location within Cleveland Location within Ohio Location within the United States
- Location: Cleveland, Ohio
- Coordinates: 41°30′11″N 81°35′59″W
- Built: 1929-1931
- Architect: Walker and Weeks
- Architectural style: Beaux Arts
- NRHP reference No.: 03000042
- Added to NRHP: February 20, 2003

The former First Church of Christ, Scientist, located at 2200 Overlook Road, in the University Circle area of Cleveland, Ohio, in the United States is an historic building that was added to the National Register of Historic Places on February 20, 2003.

Built from 1929 to 1931 at a cost of $1 million, it was designed by the noted Cleveland firm of Walker and Weeks, who later designed Severance Hall, to which this building is sometimes compared. An unusual feature of the building is its tall minaret-like semi-detached bell tower, which now functions only as a smokestack. Known today as the Nottingham-Spirk Innovation Center, the building is now owned by Nottingham Spirk, which from 2003 to 2005 renovated it for its headquarters. The present First Church of Christ, Scientist building is located at 3181 Fairmount Boulevard in Cleveland Heights.

== See also ==
- National Register of Historic Places listings in Cleveland, Ohio
- List of former Christian Science churches, societies and buildings
- First Church of Christ, Scientist (disambiguation)
