= Marquis D. Jones Jr. =

American judge

Marquis D. Jones Jr. served as a State of New Jersey Superior Court Judge, Ocean County, from 2008 to 2015. Jones was one of only two African Americans to serve on the Ocean County Superior Court bench at the time. Prior to being appointed judge, Jones was First Assistant Corporation Counsel/Acting Corporation Counsel, in Newark's Law Department, working under Cory A. Booker, then Mayor of Newark, from 2006 to 2008. Upon taking the bench as Superior Court Judge, Booker called Jones "inspirational."

From 2003 to 2006, Jones served as Deputy Attorney General in the New Jersey Office of the Insurance Fraud Prosecutor (OIFP). In this role, Jones is credited with prosecuting Medicaid fraud matters. He also served as an editor for the NJ Office of Insurance Fraud Prosecutor's 2004 and 2005 Annual Report to New Jersey's Governor and State Legislators. Jones graduated from Rutgers Law School, Newark, in 1994, and from Rutgers University New Brunswick in 1991 with a B.A. in journalism and economics. He is currently a practicing family law attorney with Weinberger Law Group.

Jones was suspended from the bench for four months without pay and was ordered to complete an alcohol treatment program by the New Jersey Supreme Court after an ethics complaint detailed his inappropriate conduct at a judiciary holiday party. During the party, Jones groped five female probation officers. Jones was not reappointed to the bench by Governor Christie.
