= Mark Jones (musician) =

American artist (born 1952)

- Born: June 19, 1952 (age 74); Cleveland, Ohio
- Genres: Jazz, classical, blues, rock, world, folk, country, new-age
- Occupations: Artist, musician, poet, philosopher, essayist, martial artist
- Instruments: Piano, synthesizer, guitar, harmonica
- Website: www.marknjones.com

Mark Jones (born June 19, 1952) is an American visual artist, musician, poet, philosopher, essayist and martial artist. Jones is an artist who has excelled in multiple genres of creative endeavor including paintings, conceptual art pieces, musical performances, compositions, arrangements and productions, poetry, essays, work as an editor and his pedagogical pursuits in music and art as well as the Chinese martial arts. He has also started and run several successful businesses. Since 1983, Jones has been based in Westchester County, New York and has spent winters in Rio de Janeiro, Brazil for over 20 years.

== Overview ==
Jones has exhibited his paintings in various galleries in Soho, New York as well as Cleveland and other cities, and was a professor of art at the Cooper School of Art in Cleveland, a private art college. He has performed his music on piano, synthesizers, guitar and harmonica in venues around the world and has had his compositions performed in several cities. He has also arranged and produced sessions for other artists. Jones has written in numerous genres including jazz, classical, blues, rock, world, folk, country and new-age, but is primarily known as a jazz and classical composer. He has been associated with his jazz ensemble, "Sound Sculpture," and has made numerous recordings as well as written and produced music for theater and websites.

The writings of Jones range from his collection of poems, "The Cry of the Lonely, The Song of the Poet," to critical essays on a wide range of subjects including philosophy, art, music, religion, sports, politics, martial arts, and literature. He has been published in the New York Times, Village Voice, Art in America, Newsweek, Mojo, Dirty Linen, Down Beat, New York Jewish Week, the Cleveland Jewish News, Black Belt, Inside Kung Fu, Tai-Chi, and others.

As a martial artist, having been practitioner of since 1971, Jones has specialized in the Chinese internal kung fu systems of taijiquan, bagua-zhang, xingyi-quan, and qigong. Jones has taught privately and given workshops in the USA, Brazil and Thailand.

Despite his large body of work, Jones has worked in relative obscurity, and in order to survive, has worked in professions including a laborer on a Ford Motor Co. door assembly line, a non-ferrous metal sorter/metallurgist, truck loader, warehouse laborer, traveling salesman, restaurant/nightclub manager, music and art teacher, wooden playground designer and manufacturer, home inspector and environmental testing consultant, the last of which he remains active.

== Early life ==
Mark Neil Jones was born in Cleveland, Ohio on June 19, 1952. His grandfather's last name was changed from "Ionis" to Jones by officials at Ellis Island in 1914 when he emigrated from Odessa, Russia, he is of Russian-Jewish descent. Joseph Jones' two sons (Mark's father and uncle) were born in Newark, NJ and moved at an early age to Cleveland where they grew up, went into business together, and started families of their own. From an early age, Mark Jones showed a propensity for drawing and music, having won a grade school art show and demonstrated an ability to play his sister's piano lesson by simply listening to it from another room. He went on at an early age to take painting courses at the Cleveland Institute of Art, private piano lessons, and gave a recital at the Cleveland Music Settlement. As a child, his maternal grandmother gave him a chromatic harmonica which also expanded his musical imagination.

=== Teen years ===
In high school, he became smitten with blues music, and began immersing himself in the study of blues on piano, guitar and harmonica. He took a few piano lessons at jazz legend Bill DeArango's studio, and then in 1969, he and guitarist pal Darryl Berk formed the Mo Schwartz Blues Band which also included Mike Washington on vocals, Alan Silver on guitar, Harlan Perry on bass and Tom Pharo on drums. They performed around Cleveland and made a couple recordings. The young Jones not only studied the blues on his own, but received a direct transmission from a number of the patriarchs of the blues. Junior Wells heard him playing piano in Ann Arbor, and gave him the seal of approval when he commanded Jones to keep playing while he joined in singing and playing harp. The teenage Jones drew accolades from Sonny Terry and Brownie McGhee at Baldwin Wallace College when he performed for them backstage, and is pictured with Howlin' Wolf and Muddy Waters in Jame Segrest's definitive biography of Howlin' Wolf. He also had an opportunity to jam and study with founding James Gang and Pacific Gas & Electric guitar legend Glenn Schwartz. In 1970, Jones, while still 17 years old, completed a thesis on a history of the blues – a scholarly recorded 4-hour lecture filled with copious musical examples, including two original works in which he overdubbed himself playing numerous instruments. It was called "the best work of its kind" by Cleveland's acclaimed patriarch blues band leader Bill "Mr. Stress" Miller.

== College ==
After a year at the University of Miami (1970–71), he transferred to Kent State where he earned a BFA in painting, and also studied literature, poetry and other humanities, and began writing poetry in earnest, having attended workshops with Robert Creeley, Robert Duncan and Galway Kinnell. He especially became interested in French Symbolist art and poetry, post-war American poetry, and Russian and Japanese literature. Jones was also able to travel to the Soviet Union with a group led by KSU president Glenn A. Olds, and spend time living in the jungles of rural Jamaica. During this period, after being exposed to the music of John Coltrane, Pharoah Sanders, Oscar Peterson, Larry Coryell, John McLaughlin, Chick Corea and Cecil Taylor, he caught the jazz bug and began teaching himself how to play jazz piano and studying Indian ragas and other world musics, as well as deepening his skills on guitar. In 1973, he formed the Cleveland Art Ensemble with himself on Fender Rhodes piano and composition, Rod Wilson on trumpet, Roy Minoff on guitar, Bruce Green on bass and Hank Levine on drums, which performed at his senior thesis art show, and included the Jones original extended form composition, "African Sketches". Jones also began his journalistic endeavors by writing some record and concert reviews for a local publication. Another interest of his that was cultivated during this time at Kent State was Eastern philosophy and martial arts. He began studying Ishin-Ryu Okinawan karate with Sensei Ron Mohr, and then Chinese Shaolin kung-fu and chi-kung (qigong) with Sifu Ni Wei Chen from Taiwan as well as extensively reading the classics of Chinese philosophy. Throughout much of his college years, Jones worked summers as a laborer and metallurgist in his father's scrap metal recycling warehouse in Cleveland, and one summer as a welder and laborer in a Ford Motor Company assembly line in Walton Hills, Ohio.

== 1974–1983 ==
In the mid seventies, after having back-packed and hitch-hiked throughout Europe with his cousin Gary, especially taking in the art in the great European museums, Jones moved to Youngstown, Ohio where he studied jazz and classical piano with local legend Sidney Jireck, and composition, harmony and counterpoint with Daniel Altsmann. He also continued his martial arts pursuit, studying an Indonesian style of kung-fu called Poekoelan Tjimindie there with Mas Bill Dobich, a top disciple of the late Goeroe Willie Wetzel, who brought the art to America from Indonesia. At this time, Jones was co-managing a restaurant/nightclub in Youngstown called "Heaven," where he designed murals for the building as well as logos and artwork and copy for adds. He also performed with acts that headlined there such as The Drifters, and hired local jazz artists who went on to much later international success, such as Ralph and Dave Lalama, Glenn Wilson and James Weidman to play on a weekly basis, despite the non-commercial financial risk. Jones moved to New York in 1977 and studied bebop piano with Walter Bishop Jr., and began showing his paintings in several Soho galleries, including the M. Elson Gallery, which provided live, recorded concerts under the name of "Axis in Soho", and Jones' paintings served as a backdrop for musicians such as Sun Ra, Paul McCandless and Paul Bley. He also exhibited his work in a collaboration with the Constantina Petkova Dance Theater Group from Bulgaria.

=== Move-back to Cleveland ===
For economic reasons, Jones was forced to move back to Cleveland in 1978, and took a sales position in his family's scrap metal recycling business. He concurrently held a brief professorship at the Cooper School of Art, a private art college in Cleveland, where he lectured on philosophy and art history and taught drawing. Jones also continued to pursue his artistic endeavors. He studied classical piano with Lithuanian virtuoso Anatas Smetona and composed a number of his finest works in both the jazz and classical idioms. He held a jazz workshop at his home in Lyndhurst, Ohio with his roommate, bassist Jeff Stewart, in which many musicians came by to perform works by Jones as well as by Ornette Coleman, Thelonious Monk, and Charlie Parker. Along with Stewart on bass, one of his frequent collaborators was the remarkable alto saxophone player, Philip Capone. Years later, Jones released the CD "Egyptian Strut" that featured Jones with Capone, Stewart and conguera Paula Potoki. Another recording from that period that will be released is “Summer Evening Pas de Deux,” a duet of Jones and Capone. During this period, Jones completed the solo classical piano work “Pyerezhivally”, his “Quartet for Oboe, Two Horns and Cello,” and was commissioned by Case Western Reserve University to compose a prelude and fugue for woodwind quartet and men’s choir, which was performed in Cleveland to much acclaim. At this time, Pulitzer nominee Joseph Packales called Jones “a composer of world class stature.” Another project recorded in that era was an avant-garde piece for 10 poets, in which he conducted poets to read their works in overlapping intervals with certain inflections according to his direction.

=== Study with Cecil Taylor ===
In 1980, Jones was accepted to study with Cecil Taylor and his ensemble, who were in residence at the Creative Music Studio in Woodstock, NY. At the end of the workshop, he performed an extended composition of Taylor's along with other students in front of a distinguished audience of jazz stars which included Carla Bley, Jack DeJohnette, Karl Berger as well as Taylor's associates Sunny Murray, Jimmy Lyons, Alan Silva, Jerome Cooper, and Ramsay Ameen. The event was documented in the April 1980 issue of Downbeat Magazine with a photo featuring Mr. Jones performing, while Taylor looks over his shoulder.

On June 19 of that year, (his birthday), he gave a solo concert called "Inner Odyssey" at Spaces, a performing arts venue in downtown Cleveland's Playhouse Square. The concert featured his 24 ft. long painting of the same name as a backdrop. It was also recorded and released on CD in 2009. Following the concert, Jones was interviewed by WRUW radio, and the interview also appeared nationally on NPR stations. During this time, he also had an essay on Norwegian Art published in "Art in America," showed his paintings in Cleveland and New York, and continued to work on his poetry.

== New York, 1980s ==
In 1983, Jones moved back to New York, where he still resides, and once again studied briefly with Walter Bishop Jr., but the core focus was to study with renowned educator and master pianist, Sal Mosca, which Jones did for seven years, only missing lessons when traveling to Brazil, where he increasingly began spending more time beginning in 1986. The study with Mosca was augmented by studies in conducting and classical piano at the Westchester Conservatory in White Plains. He also gave private lessons in piano, guitar, bass and visual art. Continually expanding his horizons (as well as trying to make a living,), he studied psychotherapy in the graduate program at Columbia University, while interning at Harlem Valley Psychiatric and Peekskill Mental Health, and studied French at NYU. In 1984, to support himself, he founded a company wherein he designed, manufactured and installed wooden playgrounds for children, and used it as the primary source of his income for about 15 years. Having no carpentry experience in his life, he started the business by buying tools, wood and newspaper adds with his credit card, building parts in his driveway, and in roughly 2 years, after having moved into a commercial space and hired employees, was doing a quarter of a million dollars in sales.

Throughout this time, Jones continued to show his art in New York, and teach art and music privately. He formed his first version of Sound Sculpture, a musical trio with Matthew Petterson on bass and Kevin Hart on drums, which was formed in order to perform his compositions. They gave a few concerts in the New York area and eventually disbanded, although Mark occasionally performed duets of standards with various bass players in venues around Westchester. He also collaborated with singer/songwriter Mark Dobson, and arranged and produced several recording sessions for him, on which Jones played numerous instruments. A CD of those sessions was released in 2005. Jones and Dobson also performed several concerts in the Westchester area. Around this time, his interest in writing grew, and he began having essays of far-reaching subject matter published in the New York Times, Village Voice, Newsweek, Mojo, Dirty Linen, Downbeat, New York Jewish Week, the Cleveland Jewish News, Black Belt, Inside Kung Fu, Tai-Chi, and others.

== 1990s ==
In the early 1990s, Jones formed a second version of Sound Sculpture with Jay Mazarella on bass and John Doty on drums. They gave several performances, and recorded 3 Jones compositions in NYC with violin virtuoso Rob Thomas and percussionist Steve Samuels. They were later released on the CD "Quartet and Solo." In the mid-1990s, feeling stressed from running the wooden playground business that he started only out of necessity, Jones began immersing himself in the study of the Chinese Internal martial arts, including tai chi, baguazhang, xingyiquan, and qigong, with a senior disciple of the esteemed Chinese martial arts master B.P. Chan, as well as with Chan himself, from whom he garnered a treasury of philosophy and ethics, as well as martial arts skills. By the mid-1990s Jones altered his income-producing activities by founding a home inspection and environmental testing company, finally extricating himself from the playground business. He also began work on a long-term project, a philosophy book that engenders the facets of life he feels of paramount importance to living a happy and healthy life – diet, exercise, mental and spiritual outlook, an appreciation and understanding of the Arts, human interaction, meditations on the meaning of reality, and how to think for oneself in a society controlled by money and conformity. He also continued to compose music and did some arranging and production work as well as give a few performances in Rio de Janeiro. In addition to Brazil, Jones traveled to Cuba twice in this period, once to the north and once to the south.

== 21st century ==
In the 2000s, Jones began building a substantial body of photography work, concentrating primarily on landscapes. More recently, he traveled to southeast Asia, taking many portraits of villagers and religious Buddhist art. In 2005, he recorded the EP, “BossAmerioca,” the first of its kind in which American and British popular songs that had been originally influenced by bossa nova in the 1960s, were redone by Jones with some top shelf Brazilian musicians such as Debora Watts, Dionisio Santos, Leco Reis and Helio Schiavo as well as the American jazz virtuosi Joel Frahm and Tim Collins. It was recorded in New York and he hopes to record many more songs that he has already arranged for these CD’s. The authenticity of the EP was highly praised by many of the surviving original creators of bossa nova including Roberto Menescal, Carlos Lyra and Marcos Valle, and was played for audiences at both Toca do Vinicius, the bossa nova museum and store in Ipanema, and at the Vinicius Piano Bar in Ipanema, which is the most venerable existing standard bearer of bossa nova. The following year, he was asked to compose music for the off-Broadway play, "The City That Cried Wolf," by the State of Play Theater Group at the New York Fringe Festival. He also was commissioned to compose music for several websites. In 2009, he assembled a third version of the group "Sound Sculpture" with Rob Thomas once again on violin, Ken Filiano on bass, Jay Rosen on drums and Joe Cruz on percussion, and performed at the world-famous Iridium Jazz Club in New York City. The concert received rave reviews and was recorded on both CD and DVD. The poet Jeff Schwartz documented the event in an original poem, which was eventually published in The Oakland Review. Jones completed an important scholarly study on a work by Bob Dylan’s, entitled “Visions of Visions of Johanna,” which he is planning on publishing. In November and December 2011, one of his music compositions “Voyage Espagnole” was performed in Dallas by Bruce Patti of the Dallas Symphony Orchestra, and 2 different pianists. It was also given to Chick Corea as a gift for his 70th birthday at the Blue Note Jazz Club. And his collection of poetry, “The Cry of the Lonely, the Song of the Poet: Collected Poems 1971–2006” is due to be published in the spring of 2012. Also being released in spring of 2012 is the CD, “Memories of the Future,” recently discovered virtuoso solo piano works originally recorded in 1981 and 1985 in Cleveland and New York. Jones has been teaching the Chinese internal martial arts to private students and has given workshops throughout the world for many years. He intends to expand his involvement in teaching these arts in order to both keep the insights and achievements of past masters alive, and to help others attain good physical and mental health as well as quality, effective self-defense abilities.
