= Wolfe Music Building =

Coordinates: 41°30′05″N 81°40′30″W

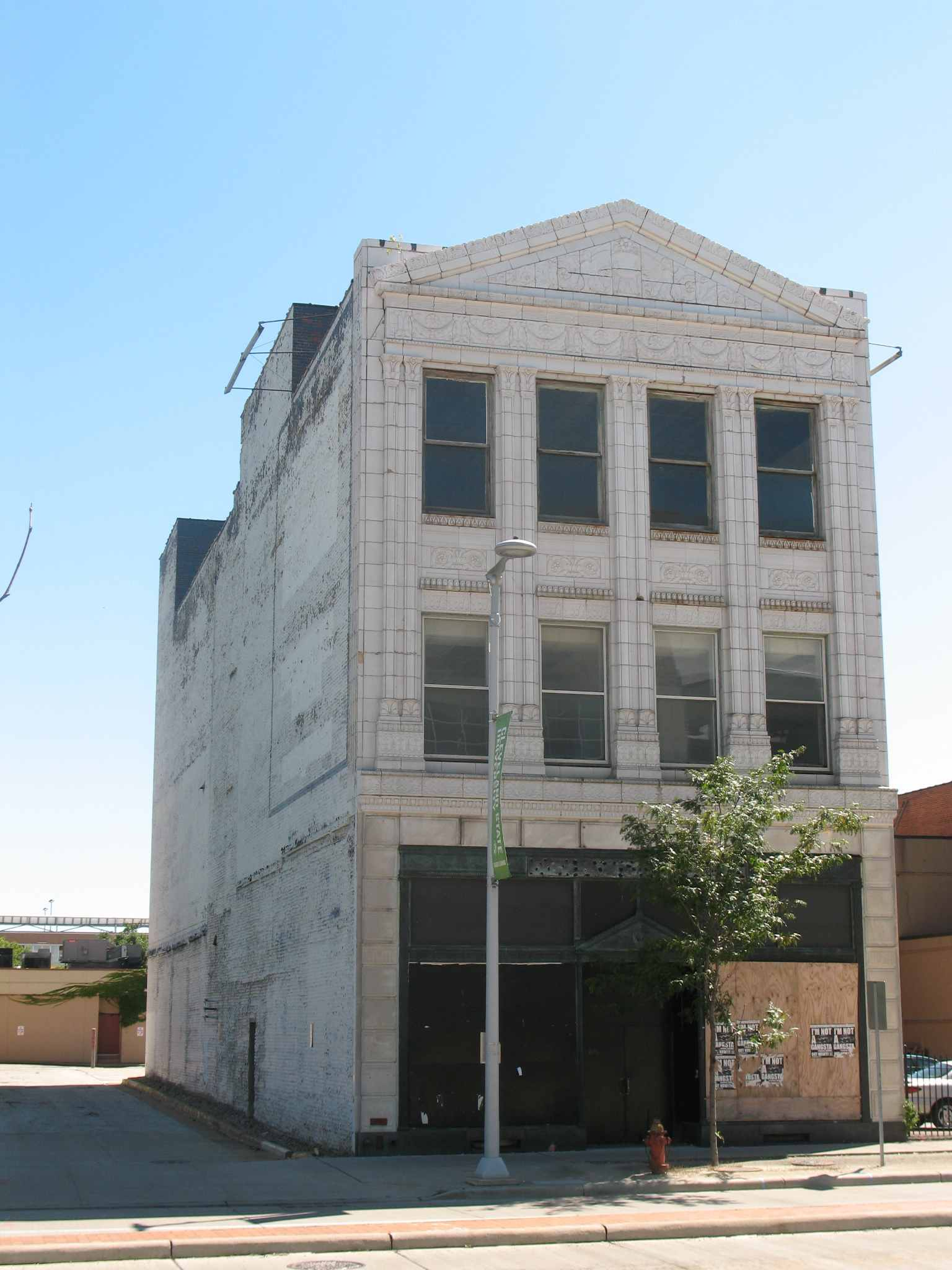
- The Wolfe Music Building, photographed in 2011.

General information
- Architectural style: Neoclassical
- Location: 2112 Euclid Avenue, Cleveland, Ohio
- Completed: 1927
- Closed: 1996
- Demolished: c. 2013
- Client: Harry Wolfe, Wolfe Music (1927–1930); National Register Company (1943–1958); Cooper School of Art (1968–1978)
- Owner: (from 1996) Cleveland State University

Technical details
- Floor count: 3

Design and construction
- Architect: Walker and Weeks
- Developer: Anthony Carlin
- Main contractor: Crowell and Little Construction Company

The Wolfe Music Building was a three-story, neoclassical building located at 2112 Euclid Avenue in Cleveland, Ohio. It was designed by the well-known Cleveland-based architecture firm Walker and Weeks in 1927. The building was demolished c. 2013.

== History ==
The Wolfe Music Building was built at a time when Euclid Avenue was transitioning from the residential Millionaire's Row to a street that was quickly becoming an up-and-coming showcase for arts, culture, and commerce. Euclid Avenue featured department stores, art galleries, design studios, architecture firms, and varied upscale retail such as fur coat and jewelry stores. The buildings on this stretch of Euclid Avenue were designed to be landmark buildings that stood the test of time, well represented by the Trinity Cathedral and New Amsterdam Hotel which shared this stretch of Euclid Avenue with the Wolfe Music Building.

The building was designed by Walker and Weeks, arguably one of the most important architecture firms in Cleveland's history, and contracted to the Crowell and Little Construction Company. The commercial building itself was owned and developed by Anthony Carlin.

Built in 1927, the Wolfe Music building gets its name from the eponymous Wolfe Music store (founded in 1917 by Harry Wolfe), which moved into the ground floor retail space at the building's inception. The structure was designed with the music store in mind, with adequate retail, showroom, and rehearsal space. The facade was white terracotta and Georgian white marble, with a bronze and glass storefront.

The store was shuttered a short time later in 1930, and the building remained vacant until 1943, when it became home to the National Register Company, operating in the building from 1943 to 1958. From 1958 to 1966 the Wolfe again sat vacant, until the space was taken over by the Cooper School of Art, which operated there from 1968 to 1978.

Later, the building was leased to a Kinko's, until the structure was purchased in 1996 by Cleveland State University (CSU), with original plans for the building to be demolished to develop a bookstore on the lot. The building had not been in use since that time.

In late 2011, the building was nominated for listing in the National Register of Historic Places, and was reviewed for local landmark status by the City of Cleveland's Landmark Commission. In the fall of 2012, however, the building was approved for demolition to make way for CSU's $45 million Center for Innovation in Health Professions. The building was demolished shortly thereafter; the CSU Center for Innovation in Medical Professions opened in September 2015.
