= Ray Harm =

American artist

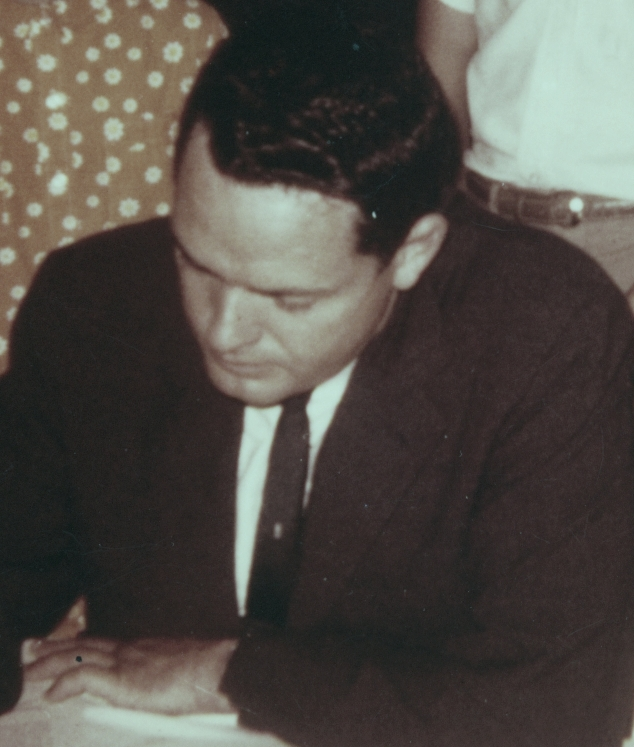
- Harm c. 1966
- Born: Ray Auvil; November 9, 1926; Randolph County, West Virginia, U.S.
- Died: April 9, 2015 (aged 88); Sonoita, Arizona
- Known for: Wildlife paintings
- Spouse: Millie

Ray Harm (November 9, 1926 – April 9, 2015) was an American artist, best known for his paintings of wildlife, primarily birds. He was also well known for art marketing and is generally credited as the co-creator of the limited edition art print market, which supplanted the traditional method where artists sold original works on an individual basis. Limited edition art prints are now the standard method of marketing paintings and similar works to the general public.

== Biography ==
Harm was born Ray Auvil in Randolph County, West Virginia; his father was a concert violinist who also was a woodsman and herbalist. His name was changed to Harm after his parents divorced and his mother remarried to William Harm. He left West Virginia in his mid-teens to become a cowboy in the American West, eventually competing on the rodeo circuit, and also training horses for the Ringling Brothers and Barnum & Bailey Circus.

His service in the United States Navy during World War II allowed him to take advantage of the GI Bill for continuing education. Harm used the opportunity to enroll in art school and afterward became a painter. While selling individual paintings, Harm worked in construction and horse training to make ends meet.

In 1961 Harm's work attracted the attention of Wood Hannah, a businessman and art collector from Louisville, Kentucky. The two men came up with the idea of making high-quality art prints of Harm's paintings, which would be issued in limited print runs. The idea was a great success and gave birth to a marketing method for art that has brought commercial and financial success to thousands of artists.

In 1963, he was appointed the first H. L. Donovan Artist-in-residence at the University of Kentucky.

Harm later wrote a weekly nature column for The Louisville Times, and was a popular speaker and lecturer. Harm was a frequent guest on the radio call-in show Metz Here, hosted for many years by Milton Metz on Louisville's WHAS-AM.

In his later life, Harm became a sharp critic of artists who copied their works from photographs by tracing directly over them or projecting an image onto a canvas and then tracing. This practice is now widespread throughout the limited-edition art industry. Harm prided himself on basing his paintings on his own sketches taken from direct observations of wildlife. On occasion, Harm said he has used museum models of wildlife to get certain details correct, but otherwise his paintings come directly from his own work.

Harm closed production of prints from his major collection in the late 1990s, with 195 pieces in the collection. He continued to do occasional works as fundraisers for various organizations where he continued to work.

=== Personal life and death ===
Harm and his wife Millie left Kentucky in 1975 to move to Tucson, Arizona, for Millie's health with his stepdaughters Cynthia and Elizabeth, whom he eventually adopted. He owned a guest ranch in Catalina, Arizona, where he led guests riding horses on trail rides into the high desert. He was a naturalist and herbalist like his father.

Later, in 1979, Harm divorced and remarried Cathy, who was from Canada.

His son, Ray Harm Jr. (better known as "Hap"), lives in Kentucky and sells prints from original works by his father that were not a part of the original major collection.

Harm died in Sonoita, Arizona, on April 9, 2015.

== Archives ==
An archive of Harm's signed prints, newspaper clippings, field notes, black and white photographs, exhibition catalogs, gallery announcements, and 53 pieces of original correspondence is housed at the Filson Historical Society in Louisville.

== Honors ==
- Named as one of the 10 most influential artists of the century by Decor Magazine.
- Named Kentucky's Man of the Year in 1964.
- Commissioned to paint a family of bald eagles by President John F. Kennedy in 1962.
