= National Council on Aging =

American nonprofit organization

- Founded: 1950; 76 years ago
- Type: Non-profit
- Location: Arlington, Virginia
- Region served: United States
- Website: ncoa.org

The National Council on Aging (NCOA) is an American nonprofit organization founded in 1950 as the first charitable organization in the United States dedicated to advocating for older Americans with service providers and policymakers. Headquartered in Washington, DC, NCOA collaborates with various organizations, businesses, and governmental agencies to promote job security, access to benefits, healthcare, and opportunities for independent and active living among older Americans. NCOA provides a variety of services to older people and caregivers including benefits checkup, economics checkup, and Medicare matters.
