= Margaret Ford-Taylor =

American actress

Margaret Ford-Taylor is a two-time Emmy nominated playwright, director, author, actress, teacher and arts administrator . Awards, commendations and honors include the Kennedy Center scriptwriting competition for "Don't Rock the Boat", and two Emmy nominations. The first was for her performance in the public television production, "American Women: Echoes and Dreams", and her second Emmy nomination was as writer of the ABC television documentary, "The Second Reconstruction". Ms. Ford Taylor has been an instructor on the history of theater and acting at Cleveland State University, the University of Akron and Kent State University. She holds an MA from Kent State University.

In addition to industrials, radio voiceovers and television commercials, Ms. Ford Taylor portrayed Aunt Eda in the Denzel Washington directed movie, Antwone Fisher, and played Mother Taylor in the Cleveland Play House production, Forest City. Commissions as a playwright include Ned’s Garden, which was on the roster at Cleveland State University, the Paul Robeson Theatre in Buffalo, New York and the West Angeles Performing Arts Center in Los Angeles; Oh, Mary, Don’t You Weep, simultaneously performed at the West Angeles Performing Arts Center in Los Angeles and Cleveland State’s Factory Theatre; Just Beyond the Junkyard, which toured nationally by the Tales and Scales classical music company of Evansville, Indiana with venues including the Tribeca Performing Arts Center in New York City, the Philharmonic Center for the Arts in Naples, Florida and the Aspen Music School Festival in Aspen, Colorado.

Early directing credits for Ms. Ford-Taylor include "Five On the Black Hand Side", "What The Butler Saw", and "Livin Fat", with James Pickens, Jr., for which she received the OCTA Award of Excellence. Ford-Taylor's first two one-act plays, "Hotel Happiness" and "I Want to Fly", earned her a fellowship to study arts administration at Harvard University.

Her most recent writing/directing assignments include "A Raisin In the Sun" for the Beck Center, "A Song For Coretta" for the Ensemble Theatre, the musicals "Listen To The Children" for the Foluke Theatre, "Double Nickel Blues", which premiered at Cleveland State University’s Factory Theatre and a debut novel, "On Liberty Street".
